= Kisah Bawah Tanah =

Malaysian adult animated television series

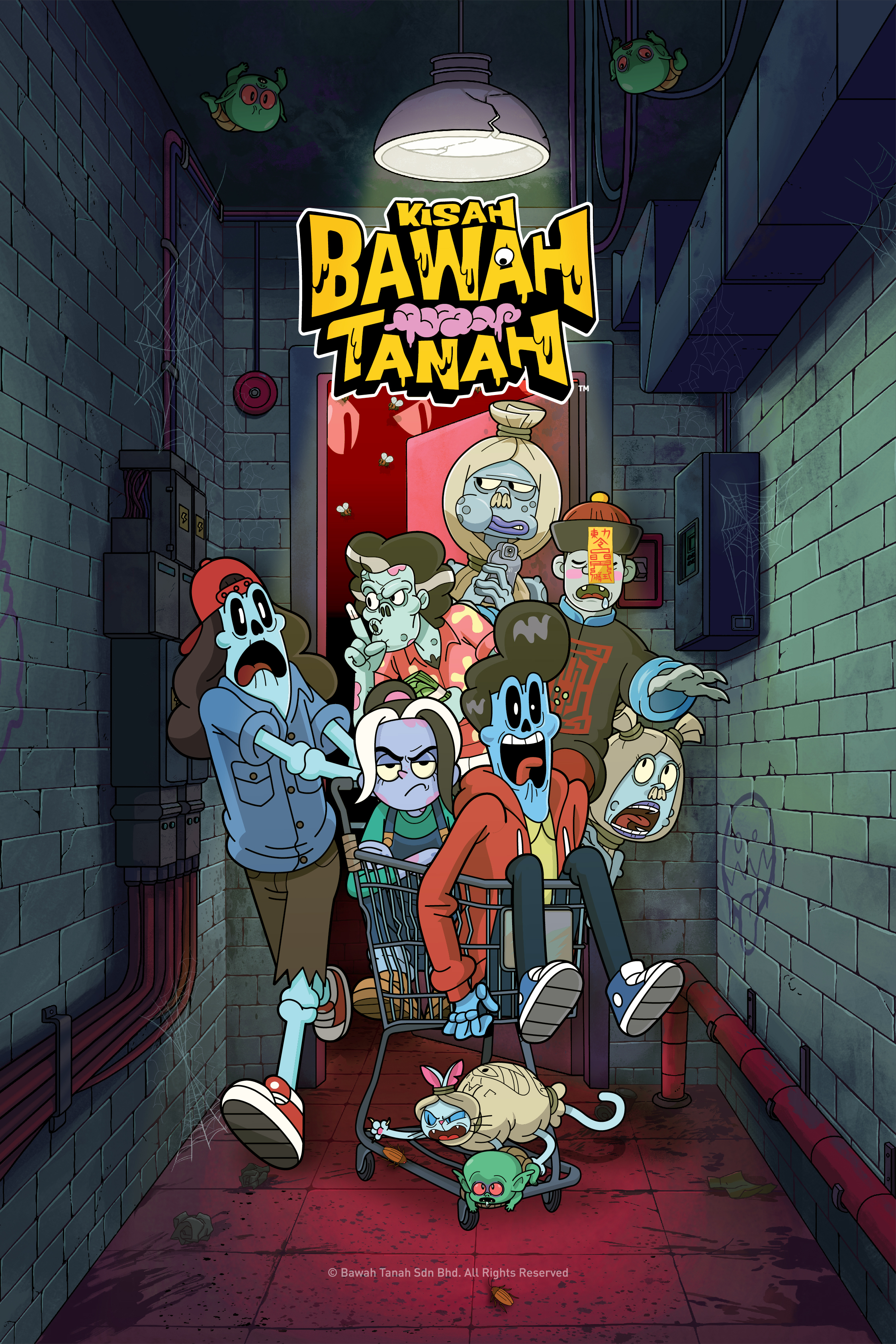
- Also known as: Kreepy Bizarre Tales
- Genre: Adult animated Horror; Comedy; Folklore
- Created by: Hendra Wardi; Arzuan 'Alet' Anuar
- Inspired by: Malaysian horror folklore
- Directed by: ahLoong
- Voices of: Azman Zulkiply; Firdaus Sufiyan; Natasha "Tashbunny" Hashim; Papi Zak "Mochie" Siti Syazwin; Megat Zahrin
- Theme music composer: Adelaine Hoh
- Composers: Masyhuri Badri; Adelaine Hoh; Ken Hor
- Original language: Malay
- No. of seasons: 1
- No. of episodes: 26

Production
- Executive producers: Edmund Chan Seng Kee; Hendra Wardi; Raye Lee
- Producers: ahLoong; Hendra Wardi; Arzuan 'Alet' Anuar
- Running time: 12 minutes
- Production companies: Animasia Studio; Spaceboy Studios

Original release
- Network: Astro Prima (Malaysia, Singapore and Brunei); Boom (Thailand)
- Release: March 9, 2026 – present

Related
- Bola Kampung Max; Chuck Chicken; Harry & Bunnie

Kisah Bawah Tanah (lit. 'Tales of the Underground') is a Malaysian adult animated television series created by Hendra Wardi and Arzuan 'Alet' Anuar for Astro Prima and Boom. The series first aired on March 9, 2026.

The series will later stream on Netflix on September 16, 2026 titled "Kreepy Bawah Tanah".

== Overview ==
This show is based on different horror folklore from Malaysia. The show has 26 11-minute episodes. This marks the very first adult animated series made in Malaysia.

== Plot ==
The series follows teenage skeletons, Sam and Zack, who go on adventures to work in The Mart for their zombie boss, Tok Mart.

== Characters ==
=== Main characters ===
- Sam (voiced by Firdaus Sufiyan): a timid, but smart skeleton and Zack's best friend who often asks as the voice-of-reason to him. He has a crush on Tok Mart's daughter, Ina.
- Zack (voiced by Azman Zulkiply): a laid-back, carefree skeleton and Sam's best friend. He often tries to find ways to be more wealthy and rich.
- Tok Mart (voiced by Azman Zulkiply): a bossy, strict zombie and Ina's father, He runs The Mart and is also Sam, Zack, and Vincent's boss.
- Ina (voiced by Natasha "Tashbunny" Hashim): Tok Mart's daughter who is half-zombie and half-orang bunian and also works in The Mart with Sam, Zack and Vincent. She often tags along with Sam and Zack on their adventures.
- Vincent (voiced by Azman Zulkiply): a jiangshi who works in The Mart. Unlike the other characters, Vincent isn't capable of speech.

=== Recurring and guest characters ===
- Po and Cong (voiced by "Mochie" Siti Syazwin and Papi Zak): a pocong couple who are among The Mart's regular customers. They have a pet cat named Pocing (voiced by Natasha "Tashbunny" Hashim).
- Liz: a Penanggalan who is a famous influcencer.
- Ramli: a mummy who works as a food delivery rider and enjoys taking selfies.
- Mayor Ketot: the greedy mayor of Bawah Tanah.
- Pak Mi (voiced by Papi Zak): an orang minyak and rival to Tok Mart.
- Boo (voiced by Megat Zahrin): a shaman who serves as a freelancer.
- Baka (voiced by Papi Zak): Pak Mi's accomplice.
- Uncle Ray: a hantu raya and ex-trainer of toyol porters, kenalan rapat Tok Mart. Appears on episode 2.
- Dalang: a greedy music mogul who tricks Zack untuk menyertai kumpulan K-pop jagaannya. Appears on episode 3.
- Ali: a suspicious cosmetics and potion peddler. Appears on episodes 4 and 20.
- Cik Salmah (voiced by Ramona Rahman): a pontianak who is a celebrity chef. Appears on episodes 5 and 19.
- Bang Kai (voiced by Bront Palarae): a swamp lodge owner. Appears on episode 6.
- Fatin (voiced by Ezza Afiqa): a water ghost who is Bang Kai's ex-girlfriend that lurks in his lodge waters. Appears on episode 6.
- Brian: the owner of a brain farm. Appears on episode 9.
- Wari (voiced by Mia Sara Shauki): the leader of a tribe of fly-men who guard a Rafflesia flower. Appears on episode 10.
- Sulaiman: a jinn that grants wishes by stealing body parts or property. Appears on episode 11.
- Master Lim Cincang: a Taoist shaman who catches jiangshi and placed Vincent under Tok Mart's care. Appears on episode 16.
- Aida (voiced by Ezza Afiqa): a spirit that possesses hospital patients. Appears on episode 18.
- Dracu-Lah: a foreign vampire with hypnotic powers who attempts to take over Bawah Tanah. Appears on episode 19.
- General Faruko (voiced by Bryan Loo): the ghost of a Japanese army general who disguises as a night class teacher. Appears on episode 21.

== Episodes ==
The show usually airs 2 episodes per week, on Monday and Tuesday at 7:00pm. Though the first two episodes aired on the same Monday, while the other two aired on the same Tuesday. Though as of May 4, 2026, new episodes air every Monday. The series later went on 3-week hiatus until it was announced that new episodes will premiere on June 8, 2026.

No.	Title	Directed by	Written by	Original release date
1	"The Mart"	ahLoong	Story by : Hendra Wardi ahLoong; Script by : Moe Izwan Kamal; Tan Eng Jun	March 9, 2026
Boo tricks Sam and Zack into bringing a dangerous demon-possessed can into The Mart.
2	"Pawang Toyol"	ahLoong	Story by : Hendra Wardi; Script by : Moe Izwan Kamal; Tan Eng Jun	March 9, 2026
Sam, Zack and Ina visit an apartment to find the toyol handler.
3	"Siapa Dalang?"	ahLoong	Story by : Hendra Wardi; Arzuan 'Alet' Anuar; Script by : Moe Izwan Kamal; Tan Eng Jun	March 10, 2026
Zack is hypnotized by an executive producer to become a singer.
4	"Susuk"	ahLoong	Story by : Hendra Wardi; Arzuan 'Alet' Anuar; Script by : Moe Izwan Kamal; Tan Eng Jun	March 10, 2026
Sam and Zack get needles in their foreheads to become handsome, but when they look at their reflections, they into old people.
5	"Amokan Salmah Si Pontianak"	ahLoong	Story by : Hendra Wardi; Script by : Moe Izwan Kamal; Tan Eng Jun	March 16, 2026
Sam and Zack inadvertently pull the nail from a neck of a famous chef, Cik Salmah, turning her into a dangerous pontianak. Guest star: Ramona Rahman as Cik Salmah
6	"Cuti-Cuti di Paya"	ahLoong	Story by : Hendra Wardi; Script by : Moe Izwan Kamal; Tan Eng Jun	March 17, 2026
Sam and Zack hunt down a water ghost named Fatin, while Ina has a date with zombie named Bang Kai. Guest star: Bront Palarae as Bang Kai, Ezza Afiqa as Fatin; Absent: Tok Mart, Vincent
7	"Mana Tok Mart?"	ahLoong	Story by : Arzuan 'Alet' Anuar; Script by : Moe Izwan Kamal; Tan Eng Jun	March 23, 2026
Tok Mart turns into a cockroach by a witch to see what it's like in their shoes.
8	"Air MaXXXwater"	ahLoong	Story by : Arzuan 'Alet' Anuar; Script by : Moe Izwan Kamal; Tan Eng Jun	March 24, 2026
Becoming sick of Tok Mart's abusive orders, Sam and Zack quit their jobs at The Mart. They start a business of selling refreshing bottled water named "Maxx Water" thanks to Boo, but all this fame started to get to Sam's head.
9	"Ladang Otak"	ahLoong	Story by : Arzuan 'Alet' Anuar; Script by : Moe Izwan Kamal; Tan Eng Jun	March 30, 2026
Tok Mart brings Sam and Zack to a Brain Farm to get brain caviar in order to keep the Mart from getting bought by the Mayor Ketot, however while doing so, Sam and Zack discover that the brain farm is a death trap for all small brains.
10	"Mencari Bunga"	ahLoong	Story by : Hendra Wardi; Script by : Moe Izwan Kamal; Tan Eng Jun	March 31, 2026
Sam, Zack and Ina search for a rare flower called the Rafflesia, but end up getting sacrificed to a bunch of tribal fly people. Guest star: Mia Sara Shauki as Fari
11	"Sulaiman Pemberi Hajat"	ahLoong	Story by : Arzuan 'Alet' Anuar; Script by : Moe Izwan Kamal; Tan Eng Jun	April 6, 2026
Ina buys a machine that has a djinn that grants wishes, but by doing that, every wish started taking stuff away from the workers in The Mart.
12	"Kubur Keramat"	ahLoong	Story by : Hendra Wardi; Arzuan 'Alet' Anuar; Script by : Moe Izwan Kamal; Tan Eng Jun	April 7, 2026
After accidentally murdering Po and Cong's pet pocong cat, Pocing, by bathing her, Sam and Zack head to the cemetery to bury and revive her, but in doing that, they accidentally bury Ina with her, causing them to fuse into a werecat.
13	"Kabus"	ahLoong	Story by : Hendra Wardi; Arzuan 'Alet' Anuar; Script by : Moe Izwan Kamal; Tan Eng Jun	April 13, 2026
When a living fog turns everyone into stone, Tok Mart takes advantage of this moment and gets the survivors of the fog to buy his products.
14	"Grafiti"	ahLoong	Story by : ahLoong; Script by : Moe Izwan Kamal; Tan Eng Jun	April 14, 2026
When Sam and Zack find cursed silver paint, it sucks everyone who ever gets close to the painting wall. Now, they have to find a way out of the Empty Realm Dimension before the paint dries up, destroys the dimension and kills all of them.
15	"RnR"	ahLoong	Story by : Hendra Wardi; Script by : Hendra Wardi	April 20, 2026
Sam, Zack, Po, Cong, Pocing and Ramli arrive at an abandoned R&R to deliver some food delivery, but little do they know (except Sam and Pocing) is that there's a giant monster with poor eyesight near the area hoping to get his deliveries. Absent: Tok Mart, Ina, Vincent
16	"Vincent"	ahLoong	Story by : ahLoong; Script by : Moe Izwan Kamal; Tan Eng Jun	April 21, 2026
When Vincent was unable to sleep due to his fulu not working right, Tok Mart and the gang head to Vincent's old village to visit an old friend named Master Lim Cincang, who was a shaman, to figure out the problem. It turns out that the red ink on the fulus are expiring. Sam, Zack and Ina go on a journey to get a new red ink.
17	"Serangan Klon"	ahLoong	Story by : Arzuan 'Alet' Anuar; Script by : Moe Izwan Kamal; Tan Eng Jun	May 4, 2026
Boo creates a mosquito to steal the blood of Tok Mart and make a clone of him, Unfortunately, the mosquito took Zack's blood by mistake. So Boo and Baka took the real Zack and put his clone in his place.
18	"Hospital"	ahLoong	Story by : Hendra Wardi; Script by : Moe Izwan Kamal; Tan Eng Jun	May 11, 2026
After an incident in The Mart, Sam, Zack, and Ina send Tok Mart to the hospital for a surgery. But soon encounter a ghost who is looking for a body. Guest star: Ezza Afiqa as Aida
19	"Dracu-LAH"	ahLoong	Story by : Ahmad Izham Omar; Hendra Wardi; Script by : Moe Izwan Kamal; Tan Eng Jun	June 8, 2026
A famous western monster named Dracula visits Bawah Tanah on Halloween night, but he doesn't seem to like all the things Malaysians monsters do in their home. So, he plans to take over Bawah Tanah and make them the way he wants them to be. Guest star: Ramona Rahman as Cik Salmah
20	"Minyak Dagu"	ahLoong	Story by : Hendra Wardi; Script by : Moe Izwan Kamal; Tan Eng Jun	June 15, 2026
Sam's been looking for a girlfriend, so he gets a chin oil from Ali to attract girls, but when Ina accidentally mistakes the chim oil for sambal belacan and adds it to the mixed rice they become attracted to Sam.
21	"Balik Sekolah"	ahLoong	Story by : Hendra Wardi; Script by : Moe Izwan Kamal; Tan Eng Jun	June 22, 2026
Sam and Zack go to a night school in order to get a degree to raise their salary, but what they don't know is that their school teacher, Faruk, is a dangerously abusive Japanese general named Faruko. Guest stars: Bryan Loo as General Faruko, Mia Sara Shauki as Student Boy
22	"Amokan Penanggal"	ahLoong	Story by : Hendra Wardi; Script by : Moe Izwan Kamal; Tan Eng Jun	June 29, 2026
When Ina's insults causes Liz to lose her temper and ruin her reputation on livestream, Baka steals Liz's body in order to promote Minyak Inc.'s products, but unfotunately he accidentally forgot the head so he grabs Pocing and puts her in Liz's body to take her place. Now Sam, Zack and Ina must help Liz get her body back before sunrise or else she will die.
23	"Kereta Kuning"	ahLoong	Story by : ahLoong; Hendra Wardi; Script by : Moe Izwan Kamal; Tan Eng Jun	July 6, 2026
When Bawah Tanah's highway gets haunted by a yellow Volkswagen Beetle, the citizens of Bawah Tanah turn to Minyak Inc's ai mart to get their groceries, causing The Mart to lose more customers. But then, Nenek Kebayan offers Sam and Zack to deliver food to her sister who is on the same highway as the yellow Volkswagen Beetle, much to Sam and Zack's horror. Though, when Sam and Zack crash into the car itself, They discover something is off with the car.
24	"The Mega Fight"	ahLoong	Story by : ahLoong; Hendra Wardi; Script by : Moe Izwan Kamal; Tan Eng Jun	July 13, 2026
Tok Mart has been beating Pak Mi's animal opponents with the help of a Polong named Zam, who has been going inside them and fighting in Tok Mart's styled fight moves. Although he was a good fighter, he dreams of becoming a dancer. Unfortunately for Tok Mart, Baka kidnaps Zam and makes a deal with Pak Mi, if he defeats Tok Mart, he will set Zam free. Pak Mi then sends Zam into Baka's body and uses him as his fighter. With Zam gone, Tok Mart decides to use Zack in the final fight against Zam in Baka's body.
25	"Kem Bina Semangat"	ahLoong	Story by : Hendra Wardi; Script by : Moe Izwan Kamal; Tan Eng Jun	July 20, 2026
After their poor attempt at teamwork causes an incident with Tok Mart's balloon, Tok Mart sends Sam, Zack, Ina and Vincent to a motivation camp to improve their teamwork skills, but the four ended up entering a haunted house with a harimau jadian named Pak Belang chasing them. On their journey, they meet a creepy little girl who claims to be called Nabila who keeps disappearing and a movie producer named Din.
26	"Telaga Tujuh"	ahLoong	Story by : Hendra Wardi; Script by : Hendra Wardi	July 27, 2026
Tok Mart sends Sam and Zack to ride on the giant talking eagle named Pak Lang to the Telaga Tujuh waterfall area to collect its water as fuel for Tok Mart's portal. But little do they know is that the area is guarded by seven bunian guardians, led by their leader, Iffah, who sentence the duo to death for lying and stealing their water. Guest Star: Ezza Afiqa as Iffah; Absent: Ina Note: The episode reveals the source for Tok Mart's portal fuel comes from the seven lakes and the season ends on a cliffhanger with Pak Mi and Baka appearing out of the blue to discover Tok Mart's portal source, leaving the cliffhanger to be resolved in either the show's next season or its movie.

== Crossover shorts ==
To promote the series, Animasia Studio has made crossover shorts with its other shows like Bola Kampung Max, Chuck Chicken and Harry & Bunnie.

=== Perlawanan Bola di Bawah Tanah (with Bola Kampung Max) ===
Tok Mart summons Roslan, Saiful and Iwan from Bola Kampung to help fight the Elemental Cats from Chuck Chicken Power Up.

1. Cabaran dari Alam Lain
2. Perlawanan Bola Sepak
3. Pembantu dari Bola Kampung
4. Pembantu, Assemble!
5. Latihan Kini Bermula
6. Peluang Untuk Menang
7. Friendly Match
8. Persediaan Terakhir Sebelum Final!
9. Perlawanan Terakhir

=== Dari Lawan Jadi Kawan (with Chuck Chicken) ===
Chuck Adoodledoo, Flick Feathers, and Wing Span get teleported into Bawah Tanah to stop and capture Dr. Mingo with the help of Sam, Zack and Ina.

1. Perjumpaan Pertama
2. Salah Faham
3. 1,2,3 Serang!
4. Pencarian Dr Mingo
5. Kerjasama Pasukan

=== Silap Mata Silap Dunia (with Harry & Bunnie) ===
Po and Cong's pet pocong cat, Pocing falls through a magic hat and swaps places with Bunnie from Harry and Bunnie

1. Pocing Hilang
2. Arnab Siapa Ni?
3. Magik
4. Tempat Baru Pocing
5. Yuhuuu

== Broadcasters ==
Country	Networks	Official Languages
Malaysia	Astro Prima; Astro Ria; Sooka	Malay
Singapore	Astro Prima; Astro Ria	Malay
Brunei	Astro Prima; Astro Ria	Malay
Thailand	Boom	Malay; Thai
