= Hantu Tinggi =

Malaysian spirit or ghost

Hantu Tinggi (lit. "Tall Ghost") is a being similar to 'Hantu Raya' or 'genderuwo' but so tall its body from the waist up is hidden by clouds. It only exists in the Western and Eastern regions of Malaysia. In Thailand, Hantu Tinggi likely resembles a closer myth called Preta.

== Other names ==
Usually people in West Malaysia call it Bajang Tinggi which means 'tall demon,' or otherwise Tinggi Puaka in modern culture of Malaysia. In Indonesia and Borneo, the common term would be 'Bapak Hantu' or 'Bapak Jin' which means 'Demon's Dad.' (Dad in this usage means bigger than the biggest.)

== Nature ==
Hantu Tinggi may be mistakenly conflated with Hantu Galah, which is a spirit in the form of bamboo in the forest. They are more similar to Hantu Raya or Genderuwo, and are possibly related. The Hantu tinggi is said to be so high it reaches the sun. They are considered ancient beings, predating even the existence of lucifer/iblis. People may be cursed with physical ailments such as broken spines or necks if they encounter Hantu Tinggi, or blindness if they make eye contact. If a nearby person approaches the spirit, they may find themselves in the Ghaib Realm, or the demon realm. Parents advise their children to recite Qur'an, or quranic verses, coupled with du'a to protect against Hantu Tinggi, or for their children to avoid tall forests or hills and mountains. Someone cursed by one may go to a Bomoh, Pawang, Dukun, or ustadz, Imam, Ruqyah healers or any Islamic healer to cure them.

They are described as similar to Hantu raya, but thousands of times larger. It is said that a single hair strand from the leg of it is as big as a body builder's arm.

== In popular culture ==
The Hantu tinggi is not as popular as Hantu Galah and Hantu Raya but they appear in Malaysian horror books or autobiographies of people who have experienced it first or secondhand. Most people will say not to believe you own any of the stories, because in Islamic Malay saying: "ghaib itu hanya tuhan yang tahu" ("only god knows of Ghaib").

== See also ==
- Toyol
- Orang minyak
- Penanggalan
- Malay ghost myths
- Slender Man
