= Mythology of Indonesia =

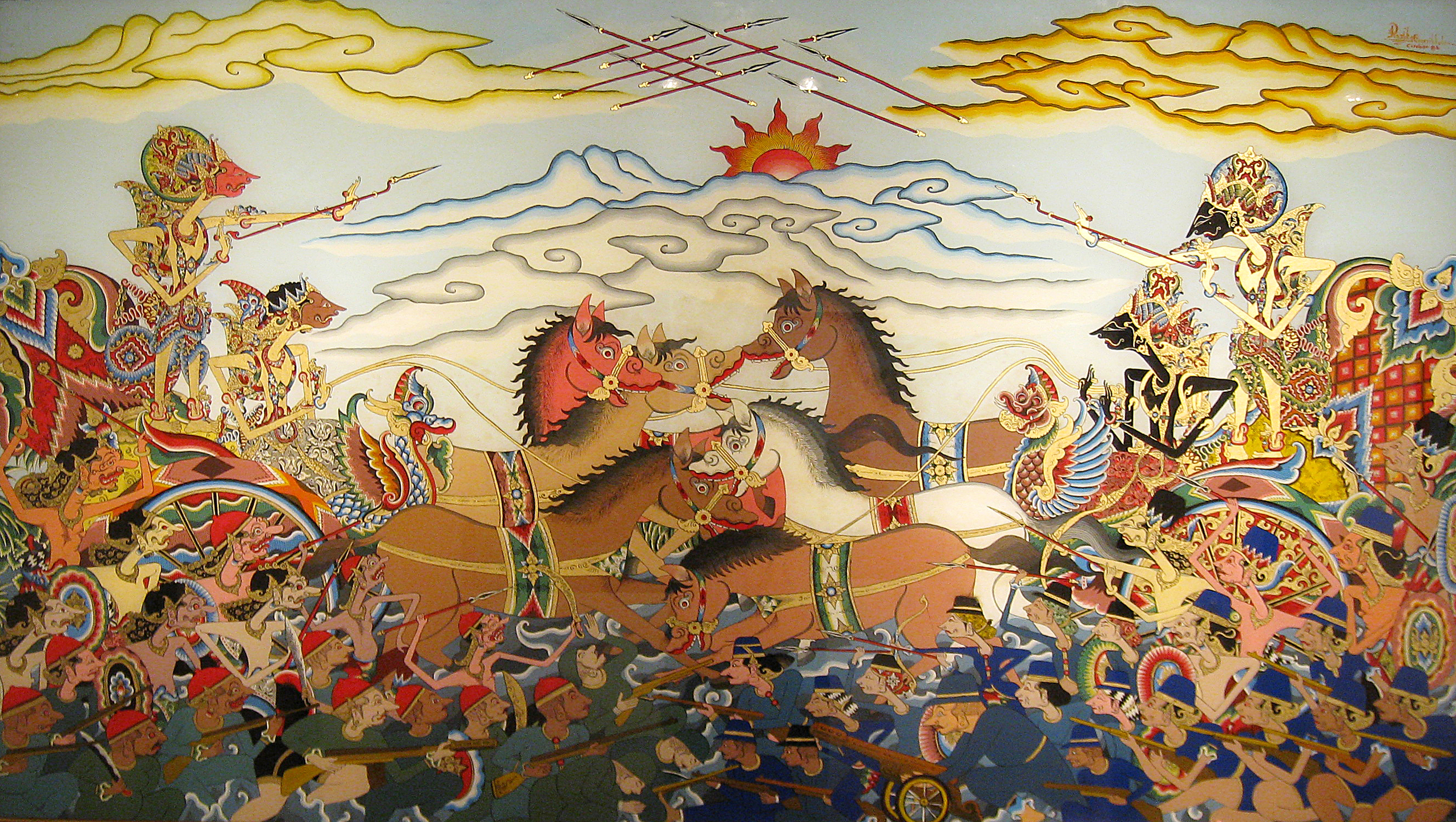
Wayang glass painting depiction of Bhāratayuddha battle in Indonesian mythology.

The mythology of Indonesia is very diverse. The Indonesian people consist of hundreds of ethnic groups, each with their own myths and legends that explain the origin of their people, the tales of their ancestors and the demons or deities in their belief systems. Many Indonesian mythologies have syncreticed with foreign mythologies such as Hindu, Islamic, or Christian biblical mythology.

== Foreign influences ==
Some native Indonesian ethnic groups that were isolated from the rest of the world until recent centuries have their own native myths and gods. These native mythologies are relatively free from foreign influences, such as Pamonas, Torajans, Nias, Bataks, Dayaks, Moluccans, and Papuans. By contrast, Javanese, Balinese, and Sundanese were influenced by Hindu-Buddhist Indian mythology as early as the 1st century CE. Hindu gods, legends and epics such as Ramayana and Mahabharata were adopted and adapted into a uniquely local form.

Many Hindu-Buddhist mythical beings have a role in Sundanese, Javanese, and Balinese mythology, including of Hindu gods and heroes, devatas, asuras, apsaras (known as hapsari or bidadari), kinnaras, etc., while native gods of nature such as Semar, Dewi Sri, and Nyai Roro Kidul are either given identified as their Hindu counterpart or incorporated into a Java-Bali Hindu pantheon unknown in India. For example, native rice goddess Dewi Sri is identified with Lakshmi the shakti of Vishnu, and Semar and his sons the Punakawans are incorporated into the epic of Mahabharata in Javanese wayang kulit, as the clown servants of the Pandawas. Several names refer to gods, such as dewa (devas), dewi (devi), dewata (devatas), and in native traditions usually referred to as Batara (male god) and Batari (female goddess). These names are similar to the native Philippines mythology of Bathala and Diwata.

After the coming of Islam to the Indonesian archipelago, Islamic mythology especially those dealing with spiritual beings, such as devils, demons, jinns and angels entered Indonesian mythology. In Sumatra, Malay, Aceh, and Minangkabau mythology was almost entirely supplanted by Islamic mythology. However, belief in local spirits such as the forest guardian, the ghost of water or haunted places still exists, often associated with a jinn or the tormented soul of a deceased human.

== Creation myth ==
Creation myths explain the creation of the universe and the world and its lands. They often explain the story of their ancestors. Most native Indonesian ethnic groups, especially those not influenced by other traditions, explain the origin of the universe, gods and deities, as well as their ancestors.

Ancient people in Java and Bali believed in an unseen spiritual entity that has supernatural powers identified as Hyangs. This spirit can be either divine or ancestral. The reverence for this spiritual entity can be found in Sunda Wiwitan, Kejawen, and Balinese Hinduism.

According to the myth of some ethnic groups in Sulawesi, the earth sat upon the back of gigantic babirusa. An earthquake happened when the boar felt itchy and rubbed its back against a gigantic palm tree. This myth has its counterpart, in the Hindu myth of Varaha, the third avatar of Vishnu as a gigantic boar that carried the world upon his back.

=== Dayak ===
The Dayak indigenous religion, Kaharingan, is a form of animism. The Dayak arose from middle-earth out of a cosmic battle at the beginning of time between a primal couple, a male and female bird/dragon (serpent). Representations of this primal couple are among the most pervasive motifs of Dayak art. The primal mythic conflict ended in a mutual, procreative murder. The body parts became the present universe stage by stage. This primal sacrificial creation of the universe is re-experienced and ultimately harmoniously brought together in the seasons of the year, the interdependence of river (up-stream and down-stream) and land, the tilling of the earth and fall of the rain, the union of male and female, the distinctions between and cooperation of social classes, the wars and trade with foreigners, indeed in all aspects of life, even including tattoos on the body, the lay-out of dwellings and the annual cycle of renewal ceremonies, funeral rites, etc.

The practice of Kaharingan differs from group to group, but shamans, specialists in ecstatic flight, are central to Dayak religion. They bring together the various realms of Heaven (Upper-world), earth and Under-world, for example healing the sick by retrieving their souls while they journey to the Upper-world land of the dead, accompanying and protecting the soul of the dead, presiding over annual renewal and agricultural regeneration festivals, etc. Death rituals are most elaborate when a noble (kamang) dies. On particular religious occasions, the spirit is believed to descend to partake in celebration, a mark of honour and respect to past ancestors and blessings for a prosperous future.

=== Batak ===
The Batak creation myth has many versions. Large collections of Batak tales were recorded by European scholars in their own languages (mostly Dutch) beginning in the mid-19th century.

At the beginning of time there was only the sky with a great sea beneath it. In the sky lived the gods and the sea was the home of a mighty underworld dragon Naga Padoha. In some versions of the tale he guarded a vast celestial treasure hoard, from which gems and diamonds were scattered to the heavens by his breath to become the first stars. The earth did not yet exist and human beings, too, were as yet unknown. At the beginning of creation stands the god Mula Jadi Na Bolon. His origin remains uncertain. A rough translation of the name is the "beginning of becoming". Everything that exists can be traced to him. Mula Jadi lives in the upper world, which is usually divided into seven levels. His three sons, Batara Guru, Mangalabulan and Soripada were born from eggs laid by a hen fertilized by Mula Jadi. Two swallows act as messengers and helpers to Mula Jadi in his act of creation. Their functions vary in the different versions. Mula Jadi begets three daughters whom he gives as wives for his three sons. Mankind is the result of the union of the three couples. Besides the three sons of Mula Jadi another god, Asiasi, has only unclear place and function. There is some evidence that Asiasi can be seen as the balance and unity of the trinity of gods.

The ruler of the underworld, i. e. the primeval sea, is the serpent-dragon Naga Padoha. He too existed before the beginning and seems to be the opponent of Mula Jadi. As ruler of the underworld Naga Padoha also has an important function in the creation of the earth.

All these six gods play a minor role in ritual. They do not receive sacrificial offerings from the faithful and no places of sacrifice are built for them. They are merely called on in prayers for help and assistance.

The origin of the Earth and of mankind is connected mainly with the daughter of Batara Guru, Sideak Parujar, who is the actual creator of the Earth. She flees from her intended husband, the lizard-shaped son of Mangalabulan, and lets herself down on a spun thread from the sky to the middle world, which at that time was a watery waste. She refuses to go back, but feels very unhappy. Out of compassion Mula Jadi sends his granddaughter a handful of earth so that she can find somewhere to live. Sideak Parudjar was ordered to spread out this earth and thus the Earth became broad and long. But the goddess was not able to enjoy her rest for long. The Earth had been spread out on the head of Naga Padoha, the dragon of the underworld who lived in the water. He groaned under the weight and attempted to get rid of it by rolling around. The Earth was softened by water and was almost destroyed. With the help of Mula Jadi and by her own cunning Sideak Parudjar was able to overcome the dragon. She thrust a sword into the body of Naga Padoha up to the hilt and laid him in an iron block. Whenever Naga Padoha twists in its fetters an earthquake occurs.

After the lizard-shaped son of Mangalabulan, the husband the gods intended for her, had taken another name and another form, Sideak Parujar marries him. She becomes the mother of twins of opposite sexes. When the two have grown up their divine parents return to the upper world, leaving the couple behind on the Earth. Mankind is the result of their incestuous union.

The couple settle on Pusuk Buhit, a volcano on the western shore of Lake Toba, and found the village of Si Anjur Mulamula. The mythological ancestor of the Batak, Si Raja Batak is one of their grandchildren.

=== Toraja ===
Torajans indigenous belief system is polytheistic animism, called aluk, or "the way" (sometimes translated as "the law"). In the Toraja myth, the ancestors of Torajan people came down from heaven using stairs, which were then used by the Torajans as a communication medium with Puang Matua, the Creator. The cosmos, according to aluk, is divided into the upper world (heaven), the world of man (earth), and the underworld. At first, heaven and earth were married, then there was a darkness, a separation, and finally the light. Animals live in the underworld, which is represented by rectangular space enclosed by pillars, the earth is for mankind, and the heaven world is located above, covered with a saddle-shaped roof. Other Toraja gods include Pong Banggai di Rante (god of Earth), Indo' Ongon-Ongon (a goddess who can cause earthquakes), Pong Lalondong (god of death), and Indo' Belo Tumbang (goddess of medicine); there are many more.

=== Asmat ===
The mythology of Fumeripits explain the origin of Asmat people, on the Southern coast of Papua. The myth explains that Fumeripits was the first man in Asmat lands. Fumeripits' canoe sank in the sea and his body was stranded on Asmat coast. He was revived by magical bird. Feeling lonely he carved numerous wooden figures, and when he created tifa drum and played it, these wooden figures magically became alive as the ancestors of Asmat people.

=== Sunda ===
According to Sunda Wiwitan beliefs of the Sundanese, a supreme god named Sang Hyang Kersa created the universe and also other gods such as Mother Goddess Batari Sunan Ambu and Batara Guru (identified as Shiva after the adoption of Hinduism). Many other gods were adopted from Hindu gods such as Indra and Vishnu. Batara Guru rules the kahyangan or svargaloka as the king of gods, while the Sang Hyang Kersa remains unseen. According to Sundanese legends, the land of Parahyangan highlands was magically created when the hyangs (gods) were happy and smiling. To fill the land Sang Hyang Kersa created animals and demons, while the myth of Dewi Sri explains the origin of rice and plants on earth as told in Wawacan Sulanjana. Sang Hyang Kersa also created seven bataras (lesser demigods) in Sasaka Pusaka Buana (The Sacred Place on Earth). The oldest of these is Batara Cikal who is considered the ancestor of the Kanekes people. Other bataras ruled various locations in Sunda lands and became the ancestors of human beings.

Sundanese folklore also explains the origin of certain things and places. The myth of Sangkuriang explains the origin of Tangkuban Perahu volcano, and the collective memory of an ancient lake in Bandung. The epic tale of Ciung Wanara explains the relationship between Sundanese and Javanese people as the tale of two contesting brothers.

=== Javanese ===
The Javanese beliefs of Tantu Pagelaran explains the origin of Java island. Batara Guru (Shiva) ordered the gods Brahma and Vishnu to fill Java island with human beings. However at that time Java island was floating freely on the ocean. To make the island stay still, the gods decided to nail it on the earth by moving part of Mahameru in Jambudvipa (India) and attaching it upon Java. Vishnu transformed into a giant turtle and carried the Meru upon his back, while the god Brahma transformed into a giant naga serpent and wrapped his body around the mountain and giant turtle's back, so the Meru mountain could be transported safely. The mountain fragments scattered upon Java created the volcanoes and mountainous regions spanned from west to east. The main part of the Meru mountain attached to the eastern part of Java. Later the gods cut off a small tip to make Mount Pawitra (Mount Penanggungan,) while the main part of Meru mountain became Semeru volcano, the abode of Lord Shiva.

The myth of Aji Saka tells the story about the coming of civilization to Java, brought by the legendary first king of Java Aji Saka, and the story of Javanese script. Soon after the gods created and nailed the island of Java, the island became habitable. However the first race to rule the island were the denawa (giant demon) that repressed all creatures and ate humans. The first kingdom in Java was Medang Kamulan, and the king was the Giant King Dewata Cengkar, the cruel King of the country who ate the flesh of his own people.

One day a young wise man by the name of Aji Saka come to fight Dewata Cengkar. Aji Saka came from Bumi Majeti. Some sources hold that his origin was Jambudwipa (India) from Shaka (Scythian) origin, explaining his name. One day he told his two servants Dora and Sembodo that he was going to Java. He told them that while he was away, both of them were to guard his heirloom (Pusoko). After arriving in Java, Aji Saka moved inland to the kingdom of Medang Kamulan. In a battle, Aji Saka pushed Dewata Cengkar into the South Sea. Dewata Cengkar did not die, instead becoming a Bajul Putih (White Crocodile). Aji Saka became a ruler of Medang Kamulan.

Meanwhile, a woman of the village of Dadapan, found an egg. She put the egg in her Lumbung (Rice Barn). After a certain period the egg vanished, replaced by a snake. The villagers wanted to kill the snake, but the snake said, "I'm the son of Aji Saka, bring me to him". Aji Saka told the snake that he would be recognized as his son, if he could kill the Bajul Putih in the South Sea. After a long, stormy battle in which both sides demonstrated strength and skill, the snake killed Bajul Putih.

As had been promised the snake was recognized as Aji Saka's son and he was given a name Jaka Linglung (a stupid boy). In the palace Jaka Linglung greedily ate the domestic pets of the palace. He was punished by the King, expelling him to live in the Jungle of Pesanga. He was tightly roped until he could not move his head. He was instructed only to eat things which fall into his mouth.

One day, a group of nine village boys were playing around in that Jungle. Suddenly it was raining heavily. They found shelter in a cave. Only eight boys went inside, while the ninth, suffering from skin disease had to stay out. All of a sudden, the cave fell apart, and the eight boys vanished. Only the one who stayed outside was safe. The cave was actually the mouth of Jaka Linglung.

After ruling the Medang Kamulan kingdom, Aji Saka sent a messenger to inform his faithful servants to bring the pusoko to him. Dora came to Sembodo and told him that Aji Saka ask them to bring the pusoko to Java. Sembodo refused, since he clearly remembered Aji Saka's order: no one except Aji Saka himself was allowed to take the pusoko. Dora and Sembodo distrusted each other, and suspected that the other tried to steal the pusoko. They fought to death. Aji Saka became curious why it was taking so long, came home himself only to discover the bodies of his two faithful servants and the terrible misunderstanding between them. Aji Saka composed a poem to them that later become the origin of hanacaraka Javanese script. The Javanese alphabet itself forms a poem, and a perfect pangram, of which the line-by-line translation is as follows.:

=== Minangkabau ===
Minangkabau culture is heavily influenced by Islamic faith. As a result, Islamic mythology can be found in Minangkabau culture. However Minangkabau people have their own legend about the origin of their tribe's name. The name Minangkabau is thought to be a portmanteau of minang ("victorious") and kabau ("buffalo"). Minangkabau royalties can be traced to Matriarch Bundo Kanduang.

=== Malay ===
Malay also heavily influenced by Islamic culture. As a result, Islamic mythology shaped the myth among Malay people. The Malay Annals (Sulalatus Salatin) describe some of these myths and often mention Islamic and Middle East references. According to Malay legends the ancestor of Malay king was Sang Sapurba a demigod descendant of Iskandar Dzulkarnain, a Middle Eastern legendary-historical figure usually associated with Alexander the Great. It was said that Sang Sapurba descended on the top of Bukit Seguntang in Palembang and became the predecessor of Malay kings in the region.

== Deities ==
The myth connected to the story of deities and mythical or legendary creatures.

- Ahool
- Antaboga
- Barong
- Batara Guru
- Batara Kala
- Batara Sambu
- Cigau
- Cindaku
- Dewi Lanjar
- Dewi Sri
- Ebu Gogo
- Hainuwele
- Hudoq
- Hyang
- Garuda
- Kinnara
- Kuda Sembrani
- Lembuswana
- Nabau
- Naga Besukih
- Manseren Manggoendi
- Nyai Roro Kidul
- Nyai Blorong
- Orang Bati
- Orang Gadang
- Orang Pendek
- Panglima Burung
- Ratu Adil
- Satrio Piningit
- Silewe Nazarata
- Warak ngendog

== Demons ==
Demons are malevolent beings and evil spirits. Some of these demons are derived from older traditions, while other might derived from recent urban legends.

- Anja Anja
- Anak Sima
- Aru-Aru
- Asu Panting
- Babi Ngepet
- Bajag angkrik
- Banaspati (ghost)
- Begu Ganjang
- Begu Ture
- Bermana Bermani
- Bombo (ghost)
- Bute (ghost)
- Cibbiu
- Cinunuk
- Dadung Dawus
- Den Bisu
- Dhengen
- Dinkel (ghost)
- Dompe
- Drubiksa
- Gebluk
- Genderuwo
- Glundung Pringis
- Hanga Igi
- Hantu
- Hantu Air
- Hantu Jeruk Purut
- Hantu Kepala Buntung
- Homang
- Inyiak
- Jailangkung
- Jaring (ghost)
- Jenglot
- Jerangkong
- Jin
- Kalimpau
- Kanun (ghost)
- Karo Kamilis
- Kambe (ghost)
- Kandoleng
- Keblek
- Kemamang
- Kiciwis
- Kongkong Pancing
- Kuntilanak
- Kuyang
- Lampor
- Leak
- Longga
- Mariaban
- Matianak
- Orang Bunian
- Parakang
- Patitong
- Pocong
- Poppo (ghost)
- Potok (ghost)
- Pulung Gantung
- Rabing
- Rangda
- Sandekala
- Sawan Sarap
- Setan Alas
- Siampa
- Si Baung
- Si Belis
- Sigulambak
- Siluman
- Si Sato
- Suanggi
- Suluh
- Suluah
- Sundel Bolong
- Suster Ngesot
- Takau (ghost)
- Tallu Ana
- Tetelo
- Tuyul
- Wewe Gombel
