= Hantu =

Hantu may refer to:

- Hantu, an Indonesian genus of spiders
- Hantu (supernatural creature), a ghost or spirit in Indonesian and Malay
  - Hantu Air, a spirit of the water
  - Hantu Penanggal, a female nocturnal ghost
  - Hantu Pocong, a spirit of the dead
  - Hantu Raya, a spirit that confers its owner great powers
- Hán tự, a uncommon Vietnamese term for Chinese characters (chữ Hán)
