= Polong =

Type of familiar spirit in Malay folklore

The polong is a type of familiar spirit in Malay folklore. It has the appearance of a miniature woman, the size of the first joint of the finger.

The polong is one of the ghosts mentioned in Hikayat Abdullah, written by Abdullah bin Abdul Kadir.

== Creation ==
A polong is created from the blood of a murdered man kept in a type of spherical bottle with a narrow neck. Over a period of one to two weeks, incantations are said over the bottle. When the period is over, the blood becomes a polong. It refers to its owner as its mother or father. The polong is hidden outside the owner's house when not in use.

== Task ==
The polong is sent to attack a victim against whom either the owner themselves or someone who paid the owner bears ill-will against. The polong is always preceded by its pet or plaything, the grasshopper-like pelesit. The pelesit enters the victim's mouth and begins to chirp. The polong follows and possesses the victim, causing them to go insane until exorcised. A polong victim froths at the mouth, tears at their own clothes, and attacks anyone nearby.

As per some sources, people who have been attacked by polong are left with bruises, a few markings and almost always have blood coming out of their mouths.

== Weaknesses ==
Unless called off by its owner, a polong victim can only be cured through exorcism by a shaman (dukun or bomoh). The method of exorcism is to ask the polong who is its parent (meaning its owner). The polong replies through the possessed person in a falsetto voice, revealing the name and village of its owner. The polong will often resist, either by making the afflicted victim attack the shaman, or by falsely accusing someone else.

== In popular culture ==
- In Marvel Anime: Blade, a Polong appears in episode 7. It is depicted as a vampire creature that obeys whoever gives it their blood.

== See also ==
- Hantu Raya
- Pelesit
- Penanggalan
- Toyol
