= Langsuyar =

Female revenant in Malay folklore

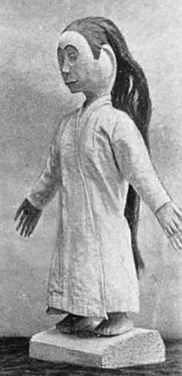
- Malaysian model of a langsuyar

Creature information
- Grouping: Mythical creature
- Sub grouping: Vampire, Banshee, Hantu Demon
- Folklore: Malay, Indonesian

Origin
- First attested: 1891 (recorded)
- Country: Malaysia, Indonesia, Singapore

The langsuyar (/ˈlɑːŋsjʊər/), also lang suir or langsuir, is a female revenant in Malay and other mythologies in the Malay Archipelago. The word is derived from the Malay word for eagle (helang).

== Description ==
A langsuyar is a type of vampire which is the ghost of a woman who died while pregnant or giving birth. Langsuyars are different from the pontianak, which is the ghost of the child who has died at or before birth. They take the form of a beautiful woman, with long black hair that reaches her ankles, although they may also take the form of a floating woman's head, from which entrails and a spinal column hang—thus, similar in appearance to the penanggalan, although different in nature. Langsuyars have also been described as having incredibly long nails, hands extending down to her feet, and wearing green robes. They prey on humans, preferring the blood of newborn male children, but also consuming newborn female children.

== Origin ==
In his book Malay Magic, Walter William Skeat, an English anthropologist, recorded the origins of the langsuyar myth, as told by Malays in Selangor:

The original Langsuir (whose embodiment is supposed to be a kind of night-owl) is described as being a woman of dazzling beauty, who died from the shock of hearing that her child was stillborn, and had taken the shape of the Pontianak. On hearing this terrible news, she "clapped her hands", and without further warning "flew whinnying away to a tree, upon which she perched". She may be known by her robe of green, by her tapering nails of extraordinary length (a mark of beauty), and by the long jet black tresses which she allows to fall down to her ankles—only, alas! (for the truth must be told) in order to conceal the hole in the back of her neck through which she sucks the blood of children! These vampire-like proclivities of hers may, however, be successfully combated if the right means are adopted, for if you are able to catch her, cut short her nails and luxuriant tresses, and stuff them into the hole in her neck, she will become tame and indistinguishable from an ordinary woman, remaining so for years. Cases have been known, indeed, in which she has become a wife and a mother, until she was allowed to dance at a village merry-making, when she at once reverted to her ghostly form, and flew off into the dark and gloomy forest from whence she came.

== Traditions ==
Charm Against the Langsuir

Langhui, Langhuā!
Your beak is stumpy,
Your feathers are cloth of silk,
Your eyes are "crab's eye" beans,
Your heart is a young areca-nut,
Your blood thread in water,
Your veins the thread for binding on cock's-spurs,
Your bones twigs of the giant bamboo,
Your tail a fan from China. (Note: The belief is that a spirit may be controlled if its origin is known.)

Descend, O Venom, ascend Neutraliser,
Neutralise the Venom in the bones,
Neutralise it in the veins,
Neutralise it in the joints,
Neutralise it within the house,
Neutralise it within the jungle.
Descend, O Venom, ascend Neutraliser,
And lock up this Langsuir.
Descend, O Venom, ascend Neutraliser. (Note: While repeating the charm, the sufferer would be rubbed with the leaves or root of the "kělmoyang," possibly Chamacladon, Homalomena, or Alpina conchigera.)

— Chant of the Sakai people,
Pagan Races of the Malay Peninsula

The langsuyar is associated with certain trees and the parasitic fern "sakat," (Note: This fern was identified as Thamnopteris nidus, a common nest fern for birds, which was later renamed Asplenium nidus) which grows in dark green clusters and is said to be a common resting place. Woodcutters that harvest wood from the poisonous Rengas trees in Malaysia must undertake elaborate exorcisms to counteract being haunted by langsuyars and other spirits. Langsuyars are also associated with a nighthawk or owl, which is said to perch on the roof of the house while a pregnant mother or infant are being attacked by the vampire. In some traditions, langsuyars take the form of a night bird, and it is believed that the hoot of an owl is the cry of a woman seeking her lost child.

The rest of the tribe can prevent a deceased woman from returning as a langsuyar by putting glass beads in the mouth of the corpse, a hen's egg under the armpits, and needles in the palms of the hands. It is believed that if this is done, the deceased woman cannot become a langsuyar since she cannot open her mouth to shriek or wave her arms and open and close her hands while flying.

In the folklore of the Sakai, an indigenous people in the northern Malay Peninsula, a langsuyar can be repelled by using charms or chants against the demon. The leaves of the gandasuli are also considered to be a powerful charm against langsuyars.

== Modern encounters ==
In 2013, villagers in the Pasir Puteh district in Kelantan, Malaysia, reported sightings of a langsuyar that was terrorizing the town. The residents described seeing a long-haired banshee flying and cackling in the night, and claims of sightings spread to nearby villages. Local authorities urged the villages to remain calm and pray together to repel the spirit. Rumors of the demonic appearances ended after a local shaman claimed to have captured four of the creatures. A local religious officer acknowledged the existence of the spirit, but cautioned against talk of magic as it may be sacrilegious.

== See also ==
- Hun and po
- Keres (Κῆρες), spirits of violent or cruel death in Greek mythology
- Madam Koi Koi
- Malay folklore
- Penanggalan
- Sundel Bolong
- Tai Thong Klom
- White Lady (ghost)
