= Orang bunian =

Supernatural beings in southeast Asian folklore

In Malaysian, Singaporean, Bruneian and Indonesian folklore, Bunian people or Orang bunian (Indonesian pronunciation: [o.raŋ bu.ni.an]) are supernatural beings said to be invisible to most humans, except those with "spiritual sight". While the term is often translated as "elves", it literally translates to "hidden people" or "whistling people". Orang bunian are described as beautiful, dressed in ancient Southeast Asian style, and nearly identical to humans in appearance. Some mythological accounts describe the lack of a philtrum. Modern depictions of Orang bunian deviate from the traditional folklore by including elf-like features, pointed ears, high fantasy-influenced attire, or modern Minangkabau long-coat clothing.

== Folklore ==
Orang bunian are said to inhabit the deep forests or high mountains in Sumatra, Borneo & Malay Peninsula, far from human contact, as well as near human communities, and are even said to share the same houses as human families. According to legend, their social structure is similar to that of humans in the ancient Malay Peninsula, with families, clans, and royalty. As with other mythical beings in Indonesian folklore, Orang bunian often have supernatural powers, and must be appeased with certain rituals and customs before humans are allowed to trespass areas which they inhabit.

Orang bunian are generally regarded as benevolent, befriending and assisting humans, particularly magicians (dukun or bomoh) and shamans (pawang). They are said to be able to intermarry with humans, and bear invisible children. According to some tales, men had married Orang bunian women, but later decided to leave the bunian community and return to the families they had left behind. However, after returning to human society, they found that many years had passed and everyone they once knew had died. These narratives have been compared to Urashima Taro and Rip Van Winkle.

== See also ==
- Hobbit
- Ghosts in Malay culture
