= Tajul muluk =

System of geomancy in south-east Asia

The Tajul muluk (taken from Arabic: تجول ملوك, romanized: tājūl mūlūk, lit. 'wandering kings') is a commonly used name for a system of geomancy, comprising metaphysical and geomantic principles considered when siting or designing buildings to improve and maintain well-being in Maritime Southeast Asia. It was traditionally practiced by shamans and architects from Indonesia and Malaysia. The term actually alludes to a book entitled Tajul muluk which covered a number of other topics including herbal medicine, astrology and dream interpretation along with geomancy. While all these subjects may be categorised under the term ilmu tajul, it usually refers to the otherwise unnamed set of rites and rules for constructing buildings in Acehnese and Malay culture.

== Terminology ==
- tiang seri / tiang ibu ("shining pillar" / "mother pillar"): The main pillar in traditional Malay buildings
- depa (armspan): A unit of measurement drawn from the armspan of the matriarch of the house
- rumah ibu ("mother house"): The main part of a house
- baris Laksmana: A symbol drawn onto a beam to protect the house from evil. Named after the magic line drawn by Laksmana to protect Sita Dewi

== Origins ==
The history of Malay geomancy has never been documented, but the system contains cultural symbolism of Indian origin, indicating that it has existed as far back as the Hindu-Buddhist period of Southeast Asian history. Some conjecture that it may have been influenced by Indian vastu sastra or Chinese feng shui, both of which have traditionally been practiced in the Malay Peninsula. The earliest account of the art comes from the book Taj al-Mulk (meaning "Royal Crown of Sovereignty" in Arabic) written for Acehnese royalty. The title was pronounced "Tajul Muluk" in Malay so the information it contained was referred to as ilmu tajul muluk or just ilmu tajul, meaning "knowledge of Tajul Muluk".

According to British civil servant Walter William Skeat in his book Malay Magic, originally published in 1900, the rituals of tajul muluk were once commonplace.

Even in the making of roads through the forest it would appear that sacrificial ceremonies are not invariably neglected. On one occasion I came upon a party of Malays in the Labu jungle who were engaged in making a bridle-track for the Selangor Government. A small bamboo censer, on which incense had been burning, had been erected in the middle of the trace; and I was informed that the necessary rites (for exorcising the demons from the trace) had just been successfully concluded.

With the rise of the Islamization movement of Southeast Asia during the 1980s, animistic and Hindu-Buddhist aspects of Malay culture were condemned and banned. Today tajul muluk is considered a superstitious relic of the past and books written on the subject are sometimes banned in Malaysia.

== Rules and theories ==
=== Soil and location ===
The auspiciousness of a location is determined by the colour, taste and smell of the soil, as well as the formation of its surface. In general, the colours of the soil from best to worst are white, red, yellow, grey and black (the Malay language also categorizes brown as a shade of yellow). Soil which is greenish-yellow, fragrant and tart-tasting will ensure an abundance of gold and silver unto the third generation. If the soil is red and sour, the dweller will be loved by their family. White soil with a sweet smell and taste is said to bring wealth and happiness. Foul-smelling earth of the wrong colour and texture will bring sickness and poverty. Soil that is full of holes will cause the occupants to die poor.

Aside from the soil, the lay of the land must also be taken into consideration. The best site for a house, city or orchard is level. The best aspect of the land's surface is that which is low on the north and high in the south, thought to bring the occupants absolute peacefulness. Land which is low on the west and high in the east is also auspicious. The reverse of these directions (i.e. high in the north and low to the south, or high to the west and low to the east) will bring poverty and death. The worst land is hilly or full of holes. A house that inclines from the southwest causes one to lose their livelihood or source of income. A house that inclines from the south brings death to its owner. If the house inclines from the west, the occupant will waste away all their money.

=== Siting ritual ===
Once the ground has been cleared, the dukun or bomoh begins smoking the area with incense (kemenyan). He then measures one depa of bamboo and sticks it in the ground together with a container of water. Incense is burnt again as the dukun recites incantations. At dawn the next morning, the stick and water are checked. If the pail of water has spilled or the bamboo has shortened, the plot is bad luck. If the water has overflowed or the stick has lengthened, it is very auspicious. Once the site has been chosen, a hole is dug in the ground for the house's main pillar. The shaman places seven grains of rice into the hole and recites mantera before inserting the pillar. If any of the rice grains are missing the next day, the site has negative energy. However, an area which is bad for one family may be good for another since the ritual is based on the matriarch's armspan.

Another, perhaps older, method involves dreams. After clearing the area, the dukun lays four sticks in its centre and calls the name of the presiding local deities or spirits. Taking a handful of soil, he recites the following chant:

Hai anak Menteri Guru
Yang duduk empat penjuru alam
Aku memohonkan tanah ini
Jikalau baik, tunjukkan alamat baik
Jikalau jahat, tunjukkan alamat jahat

Ho, children of Mentri Guru
Who dwell in the four corners of the world
I crave this plot as a boon
If it is good, show me a good omen
If it is bad, show me a bad omen

The soil is then wrapped in white cloth, fumigated with incense and placed under the occupant's pillow at night. Before sleeping, the last two lines of the aforementioned charm are repeated. If the occupant has a nightmare, the house cannot be built. If the dream is good, the four corners of the site are pegged with sticks. A dead branch is then taken and heaped with earth before being set on fire. When it has been reduced to ashes, it is swept up and covered. A similar incantation is then spoken:

Hai, segala orang yang memegang tanah ini empat penjuru alam
Kama aku hendak berbuat rumah
Jikalau baik, tunjukkan alamat baik
Jikalau jahat, tunjukkan alamat jahat

Ho, holders of this land who dwell in the four corners of the world
I wish to build a house on this site
If it is good, show me a good omen
If it is bad, show me a bad omen

The next morning, the ashes are uncovered and God will show a sign of the plot's good and bad potential. This method is no longer practiced today because of its pre-Islamic origin. The name Menteri Guru, which translates literally as "minister teacher", may be an alternate form of Betara Guru (from the Sanskrit term Bhattara Guru meaning "teacher-lord"), an epithet for the Hindu god Siwa or Shiva. The four corners mentioned in the incantation is found in Malay, Indian and Chinese spiritual world concepts. In Hindu cosmology the surface of the earth is represented as a square in reference to the horizon's relationship with sunrise and sunset.

=== Erecting the main pillar ===
Traditional Malay buildings have at their centre a main pillar called the tiang seri where the spirit of the house (semangat rumah) is said to dwell. Sometimes it may decorated with the family kris wrapped in yellow cloth. The construction of any building begins by digging a hole for this central post, accompanied by the recitation of a charm. The best time of day for this is 7 a.m. The workers must ensure that their shadows do not fall on the hole or on the post itself, or illness will follow. Certain materials are then deposited into the hole such as brazilwood (kayu sepang), ebony (kayu arang), scrap metal, tin-ore, a copper coin, a broken hatchet-head, or a candle-nut (buah gorek). To appease the local earth-spirit or demon (jembalang tanah or puaka), the head, feet and blood of an animal are also deposited in the hole. Depending on the malignity of the earth-spirit, the animal may be either a fowl (ayam), a goat (kambing) or a buffalo (kerbau). For a small demon, an egg will suffice. Among the natives of ancient Borneo the victim of this sacrifice would have been human, and the Malay custom of killing an animal for the purpose arose from what was once human sacrifice. As recently as the beginning of the 20th century, the Malaysian government would bury human skulls under the foundation of any large structure.

A number of methods are used to ascertain whether the hole is in a propitious location. In one example a white cup is filled with water, fumigated with incense, and left in the hole overnight. If the cup is still full the next day or has live insects inside, it is a good sign. If the insects are dead or the water has lessened, it is a bad omen. Alternatively, one could wait until everyone has left the area before picking up three clods of soil, holding them over incense, and reciting a certain mantera or mantra. The soil must be taken home without ever turning to look back. Upon arrival, the earth is placed under the occupant's pillow before sleeping. If they have a bad dream, one of the clods is thrown away. This process continues until it results in a good dream, when the clod of earth which induced the dream is placed in the hole and serves as the tiang seri pole's foundation.

An example of a charm recited when erecting the tiang seri runs as follows:

Hai Raja Guru, Maharaja Guru, daripada tajar menyenseng Engkaulah anak Betara Guru Hai hantu tanah, benah tanah Aku tahu asal kau jadi: Jembalang tanah Daripada kilat sabung-menyabung Undur kau dari sini ke laut yang dalam Aku tahu asal kau jadi: Ke rimba yang sunyi Daripada embun setitik Antara aku dengan engkau, aku tahu asal kau jadi

Ho Raja Guru, Maharaja Guru Thou art sons of Bhattara Guru Ho, ghost of the earth, blight of the earth I know the origin from which you sprang: Demon of the earth From the flashing lightning Retire ye hence to the depths of the sea I know the origin from which you sprang: To the peace of the forest From a single drop of dew Betwixt you and me, I know the origin from which you came into being

=== Length of the threshold ===
As with the Chinese bagua and the guardians of Jambudvipa in Indian culture, Malay astrology and geomancy also uses eight points of divination. Known as the "eight beasts", each one corresponds to an animal possessing its own characteristics. The eight beasts regulate the length of a house's threshold. This is measured in a unit called depa, the length of the house-mistress's armspan. After measuring off a depa on a piece of string, the string is folded into three before one-third of its length is cut off. The remainder is folded into eight and reduced to one-seventh. The remaining seventh is checked against the threshold's length, and the number of times it is contained therein determines which animal it corresponds to. If the measurement is unlucky, the threshold would be cut shorter. The ominous significance of the eight beasts is often illustrated in rhyme. An example, recorded by Walter William Skeat, reads as follows:

1. Dragon
"A dragon of bulk, a monster dragon
Is this dragon that turns round month by month
Wherever you go you will be safe from stumbling-blocks
And all who meet you will be your friends"

2. Dairy cow
"There is the smoke of a fire in the forest
Where Che Ali is burning lime
They were milking the young dairy-cow
And in the midst of the milking it sprawled and dropped dead"

3. Lion
"Lion of courage, lion of valour
Is the lion gambolling at the end of the Point
The luck of this house will be lasting
Bringing prosperity from year to year"

4. Dog
"The wild dog, the jackal
Barks at the deer from night to night
Whatever you do will be a stumbling-block
In this house men will stab one another"

5. Cow
"The big cow from the middle of the clearing
Has gone to the deep forest to calve there
Great luck will be your portion
Never will you cease to be prosperous"

6. Donkey
"The ass within the fort
Carries grass from morn to eve
Whatever you pray for will not be granted
Though big your capital, the half will be lost"

7. Elephant
"The king's big riding-elephant
Has its tusks covered with amalgam
Good luck is your portion
No harm or blemish will you suffer"

8. Crow
"A black crow soaring by night
Has perched on the house of the great Magic Prince
Great indeed is the calamity which has happened
Within the house its master lies dead"

The eight beasts (binatang yang delapan)
English	Malay
Dragon	Naga	The luckiest of the beasts
Dairy-cow	Sapi	The house's owner will die
Lion	Singa	The owner will be safe and wealthy
Dog	Anjing	Occupants will argue with each other
Drought-cow	Lembu	The owner will be rich and held in high regard by others
Donkey	Keldai	Owner won't be able to hold onto money, and wishes won't materialize
Elephant	Gajah	The owner will be successful in all their endeavors
Crow	Gagak	Worst of luck. Brings sickness, loss and death

=== House height ===
The rules of a house's height are also determined by the matriarch's armspan. Ideally the main pillar should be a round number (e.g. 5 depa) but the actual measurement usually contains a fraction (e.g. five and two-tenths depa). Depending on the amount of extra length, there would be a different result.

House height rules (petua tinggi rumah)
Fraction of extra height	Malay	English
One tenth depa	tinggal tangga	leave stairs	The house will always be relocated
Two tenths depa	asap kelam	blurry smoke	Indicates sadness or illness
Three tenths depa	singa sempurna	perfect lion	Brings blessings
Four tenths depa	anjing kekurangan	scarce dogs	Occupants will constantly argue with each other
Five tenths depa	kuda ketinggian	high horse	Someone will reach a high post
Six tenths depa	gagak kepatukan	pecking crow	Indicates sickness or death
Seven tenths depa	harimau pahlawan	warrior tiger	The son will be a warrior
Eight tenths depa	naga keperbuan	rushing dragon	Wards off hardship and illness
Nine tenths depa	neraca timbangan	balanced scales	Someone will become village leader
Round number	ular cintamani	chintamani snake	Great luck, named after a legendary snake believed to bring good fortune

Malay village houses were built so that they could be disassembled and rebuilt when the situation demanded it such as war, floods or famine. Some have noted that these rules consider the number four unlucky, just as in Chinese superstition.

=== Direction of the door ===
The direction that the house's door faces is also said to play a part in determining the occupants' well-being. The worst direction for the door to face is south, which brings bad career luck. A door which faces the west is said to bring knowledge or encourages the coming of someone well-learned, especially in matters of religion. This is probably a reference to the fact that foreigners, particularly the Indian Muslims who introduced Islam in the region, sailed to the Malay Peninsula from the west. A door that faces east ensures many grandchildren and a life of tranquility. A north-facing door brings wealth.

== See also ==
- Geomancy – Method of divination that interprets markings on the ground
- Feng Shui – Chinese traditional practice
- Malaysian folk religion – Animistic and polytheistic beliefs and practices
- Vastu Shastra – Indian architecture and design-related texts
