= Toyol =

Undead infant in southeast Asia folklore

A toyol or tuyul is an undead infant in Indonesian and Malay folklore. It also appears in the various other mythologies of Southeast Asia and is typically invoked as a helper by shamans (dukun, pawang, or bomoh) by means of black magic. A common use for the toyol includes using it for financial gain, where the creature robs people of their riches, making it similar to the Babi ngepet, a boar demon in Indonesian mythology, and the Hantu Raya, a familiar spirit in Malay folklore. As such, the toyol is popularly known to bring good luck to its host, but mishap to those who are unfortunate to encounter them.

== Names ==
The toyol is known by different names across Southeast Asia. The Malay word toyol is tuyul in Indonesian, thuyul in Javanese, and kecit in Sundanese. It is also known as cohen kroh in Khmer, and kwee kia in Hokkien. In Thai, the male is called kuman-thong while the female is named kuman-lay. A similar creature exists in Philippine mythology which is known as tiyanak.

== Appearance and behaviour ==
The toyol is traditionally and commonly described as looking no different from a near-naked toddler. However, regional differences can account for variation in appearance and characteristics; the toyol is claimed to look like a normal child with the exception of sharp teeth and red eyes, but the Indonesian tuyul has the addition of green skin and pointed ears. The tuyul has the ability to scale walls and climb roofs. Modern depictions often give the toyol a goblin-like appearance with green or grey skin, pointed ears, and clouded eyes.

The toyol's behaviour and personality is typically said to be similar to that of a playful child, where it enjoys sweets, toys, and clothes. Its small size and childish tendencies are said to render it harmless. Behavioural characteristics can also differ according to region. For instance, the kuman-thong and kuman-lay are said to be more benevolent, and unlike the toyol whose owner has to tame, these Thai spirits do not need neither sacrifices nor rituals in order to invoke their services. The toyol is also said to only steal half of a person's valuable belongings. While widely known to help its guardian pilfer, the toyol carries out other mischievous acts when commanded.

== Interpretation and symbolism ==
The belief in the toyol - and by extension, child supernatural creatures - has links to the common Asiatic belief that every being consists of a soul, including that of babies. The many similarities between Southeast Asian countries have also been remarked to be a sign of the nations' close cultural ties.

Aside from the belief in the supernatural, the toyol serves a range of social functions, including acting as a disciplinary tool, to assist in maintaining social hierarchy, and to ward off perceived outsiders away from the community.

It is not an uncommon occurrence for people to associate those with wealth and success to having used a toyol, and this negative association is extended to even government officials. These stories of corruption and amorality have been theorised to be a method of negating dissonance, where through associating social status with the supernatural, it allows for the people to believe and accept that the matter is beyond their control. On the other hand, such accusations can simply be a way of expressing one's resentment.

The toyol remains widely used in a variety of ways and through various mediums, including via games, literature, and television. These point to a society and community that continues to hold sustained belief in the existence of toyols and other supernatural entities, where to them, such folklore contributes a part of their lived reality.

== Modern encounters and usage ==
In 2006, a fisherman from Kuala Pahang, Malaysia reported finding a toyol that had been enclosed in a bottle on coastal shores. The toyol was handed over to the local state museum where the director noted its red eyes and black clothing.

The toyol has also been used in theft crimes - though not in the supernatural sense - through the exploitation of people's belief in the creature. In 2009, a 77-year-old woman living in Bukit Bandaraya, Malaysia was tricked into believing that her valuables were being targeted by a toyol through an anonymous phone call. She was advised to hide them following specific instructions but soon found them to be stolen. Her resulting loss amounted to RM700,000.

In 2016, a Malaysian local online newspaper reported a villager having physically encountered a green-skinned toyol after assuming his and other residents' missing money had been the work of a thief.

As recently as 2019, it was reported that residents living in the Mengwi subdistrict of Badung Regency in Bali, Indonesia believed that a tuyul was the reason for why one resident had mysteriously lost IDR1.4 million. This was attributed to the discovery of seemingly child-like footprints found on the victim's car. In response to the incident, local police cautioned that the culprit was likely to be intentionally attempting to mislead them.

== Similar entities beyond Southeast Asia ==
Spirits of children are not limited to Southeast Asia. In Japanese folklore, the zashiki-warashi shares some similarity to the toyol where they are believed to bring good fortune to their owners. The zashiki-warashi are also mischievous in nature and enjoy sweets and toys, but they differ from the toyol in numerous ways. Rather than appearing as an infant, the zashiki-warashi are said to look like a young child or adolescent.

== In popular culture ==
=== Film ===
- Malik Selamat directed a 1980 Malay horror film Toyol, starring Sidek Hussain and Mahmud June.
- In Billy Chan's 1987 Hong Kong film Yang Gui Zi (roughly translated as "feeding a child spirit", also known by its English title Crazy Spirit), a jewelry store owner, wishing to have an heir, travels from Hong Kong to Thailand to obtain a spirit baby from a Taoist master, who seals it in an amulet. The amulet, on its way to Hong Kong, gets lost in transit and is found by a woman trying to conceive a child. She accidentally cuts her finger, causing her blood to drip on the amulet and releasing the child spirit.
- The 2011 Malaysian comedy film Alamak... Toyol! features a toyol as its plot device.
- In the 2013 Singapore horror film Ghost Child, a family is troubled by a tuyul which arrives from Indonesia in an urn.
- In the 2016 Indonesian horror film Tuyul: Part 1, a new family moves into an old house of the wife's mother after she died. The husband finds a bottle hidden mysteriously underneath the broken wooden floor, which is home to a creature that could endanger them.

=== Literature ===
- The 2010 story Toyol by Nicole Lee is a narrative written from the perspective of a female toyol named Meera who is an originally deceased child that has been brought back to life.
- The 2012 book Malay Sketches by Singaporean writer Alfian Sa'at has a segment titled "A Toyol Story" that focusses on a father-son pair. The toyol here is used more as a literary device.

=== Music ===
- "Toyol" is a song by late Malaysian singer-songwriter Sudirman in his album Perasaan (1979). The lyrics include describing the physical attributes of a toyol.

=== Television ===
- In season 1 of the HBO Asia Original horror anthology series Folklore, episode 5 is titled "Toyol (Malaysia)" and features a toyol.
- The Malaysian animated television series Upin & Ipin features a toyol in the episode "Kisah 2 Malam."

=== Video Game ===
- Baby Tuyul (2015) and Greedy Toyol (2017) are mobile games that use the apk file format. Both games involve collecting coins amidst various obstacles.
- The indie game Pamali: Indonesian Folklore Horror (2018) offers a purchasable downloadable content (DLC) called The Little Devil that centres around a tuyul.
- Nightmare (INCUBO) (2019) is an indie game that features a tuyul.
- Tuyul Gundul (2019) is a mobile game where the player takes on the role of a toyol, stealing money from villagers whose houses have been booby-trapped.
- Toyol Attack! is an upcoming mobile game that, as of 2020, is being developed by members of Universiti Tunku Abdul Rahman, Malaysia. The game is intended to promote Malaysian heritage and folklore to the younger generation.

=== Other ===
- Drivers for gig economy services in Southeast Asia, such as Grab and Gojek, use third-party grey market apps called "tuyul" to optimize their work experience. The apps are so named because like the tuyul in folklore, they help earn money through potentially illegal means.
- Toyol was the name of a Malay humour magazine that ceased publication in 1987.

== See also ==
- Babi ngepet
- Familiar spirit
- Goblin
- Hantu Raya
- Imp
- Kuman thong
- Jenglot
- Pelesit
- Polong
- The Bottle Imp
