= Penanggalan =

Vampiric flying head in Malay myth

The penanggalan or penanggal is a nocturnal vampiric entity from Malay ghost myths. It takes the form of a floating disembodied woman's head, with its organs and entrails trailing from its neck. From afar, the penanggalan is said to twinkle like a ball of flame, similar to the will-o'-the-wisp phenomenon.

The penanggalan belongs to a constellation of similar mythological entities that can be found under different names across different regions of Southeast Asia; these regional variations all share in common that they are characterized by a disembodied head of a woman, with organs and innards hanging from its neck. Alongside the penanggalan, there is the Ahp (Khmer: អាប) in Cambodia; the Kasu (Lao: ກະສື, pronounced [ka.sɯ̌ː]) in Laos; the Krasue (Thai: กระสือ, pronounced [krā.sɯ̌ː]) in Thailand and much of Southeast Asia; the Kuyang (pronounced [ku.jaŋ]), Leyak (Indonesian pronunciation: [le.ak]); the hantu polong of the Temuan; the Ma lai (Vietnamese: ma lai) in Vietnam; and the Manananggal in the Philippines.

The name penanggalan derives from the word tanggal, meaning "to remove or take off", because its form is that of a floating disembodied woman's head, with its organs and entrails trailing from its neck.

Though commonly referred to in its native languages as a ghost, the penanggalan cannot be readily classified as a classical undead being. Rather, it is a witch that developed the ability to take such a form through meditation in a vat of vinegar. The creature is, for all intents and purposes, a living human being during daytime or at any time when it does not detach itself from its body. The penanggalan often hunts at night for menstruation/blood from birth. It also hunts for pregnant women and young boys.

== Nature ==
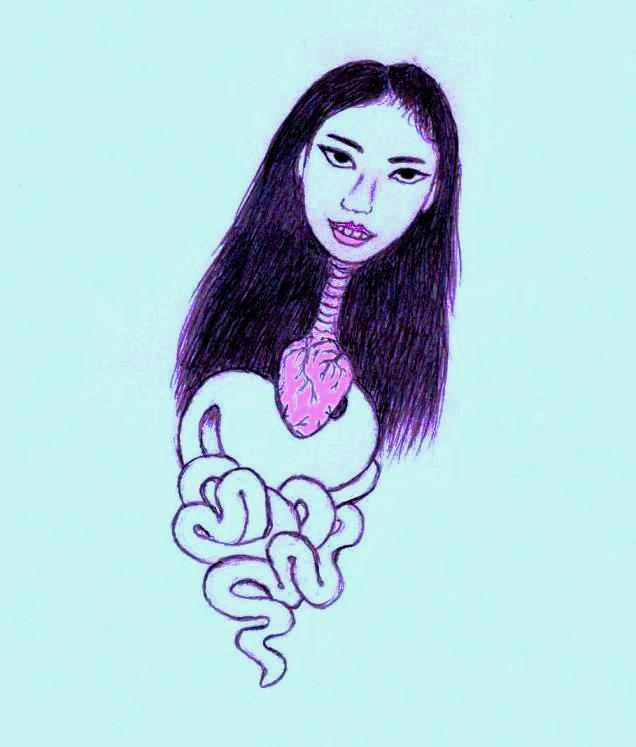
Penanggalan

In Malaysian folklore, penanggal are mortal women who practice black magic. To become a penanggal, a woman must meditate during a ritual bath in vinegar, with her whole body submerged except for the head. Only active in penanggal form at night, the creature regularly soaks its organs in vinegar to shrink them for easy entry back into her body. The penanggal thus carries an odor of vinegar wherever she flies, and returns to her body during the daytime, passing as an ordinary woman. However, a penanggal can always be told from an ordinary woman by the smell of vinegar. The penanggal was also mentioned in Hikayat Abdullah, written in 1845, much to the amusement of Sir Stamford Raffles:

"The pĕnanggalan was once a woman; she used the magic arts of a demon whom she trusted by devoting herself to his service day and night for an agreed term, after which she was able to fly; that is to say her head and neck could fly when loosened from her body with the viscera depending from them, while the body remained behind; wherever the person whom she wished to injure might live, thither flew her head and bowels to suck his blood."

Modern urban legends offer alternative views of the penanggal. This includes being the result of a curse, or the breaking of a demonic pact. One story tells of a young woman who was taking a ritual bath in a tub that once held vinegar. While bathing herself and in a state of concentration or meditation, a man entered the room without warning and startled her. The woman was so shocked that she jerked her head up to look, moving so quickly as to sever her head from her body, her organs and entrails pulling out of the neck opening. Enraged by what the man had done, she flew after him, a vicious head trailing organs and dripping venom. Her empty body was left behind in the vat.

== Victims ==
The penanggalan's victims are traditionally pregnant women and young children, men are usually avoided by the penanggalan and spy on them throughout the night as a way to protect the expectant mother or newborn. As traditional Malay dwellings were stilt houses, the penanggal would hide under the stilts of the house and use its long tongue to lap up the blood of the new mother. Those whose blood the penanggalan feeds on contract a wasting disease that is almost inescapably fatal. Furthermore, even if the penanggalan is not successful in her attempt to feed, anyone who is brushed by the dripping entrails will suffer painful open sores that won't heal without a bomoh's help.

The most common protection against a penanggal attack is to scatter the thorny leaves of any of the subspecies of a local plant known as mengkuang, which has sharp thorny leaves and would either trap or injure the exposed lungs, stomach and intestines of the penanggal as it flies in search of its prey. These thorns, on the vine, can also be looped around the windows of a house in order to snare the trailing organs. This is commonly done when a woman has just given birth. The shards of glass glued to the top of the walls around a house serve the same purpose, in addition to protecting against thieves. As an extra precaution, the pregnant woman can keep scissors or betel nut cutters under her pillow, as the penanggalan is afraid of these items.

Midwives who become Penanggalans at night appear as normal women in the daytime. They, however, can be identified as Penanggalans by the way they behave. When meeting people, they will usually avoid eye contact and when performing their midwife duties, they may be seen licking their lips, as if relishing the thought of feeding on the pregnant woman's blood when night comes.

Once the penanggal leaves its body and is safely away, it may be permanently destroyed by either pouring pieces of broken glass into the empty neck cavity, which will sever the internal organs of the penanggal when it reattaches to the body; or by sanctifying the body and then destroying it by cremation or by somehow preventing the penanggal from reattaching to its body by sunrise.

Another non-lethal way to get rid of penanggalan is to turn over the body, so that when the head attached back it will be attached reverse side, thereby revealing to everyone what she really is.

== In popular culture ==
The penanggalan is featured as a monster in the 1981 Dungeons & Dragons rulebook Fiend Folio. The 1981 Indonesian horror film Mystics in Bali is partly based on the penanggalan legend, and the American anthology streaming television series Creepshow features a penanggalan in the season three episode "Drug Traffic". (Note: An article by Bloody Disgusting identifies the entity depicted in the episode as a penanggalan, while an article by Decider identifies it as the similar Krasue.) The penanggalan also appears in the Hellboy: The Troll Witch and Others comics, as well as the Image Comics title Cry Havoc. The penanggalan is additionally featured as a playable character in the 2016 video game Dead by Daylight.

== See also ==
- Hantu (supernatural creature)
- Chonchon, a Mapuche creature that also detaches its head
- Krasue
- Langsuyar
- Leyak
- Polong
- Rokurokubi and Nukekubi, Japanese yokai which take the form of a woman with either an extremely long neck or a head which can detach itself and move freely from the body
- Vampires in popular culture
