= Pelesit =

Spirit in Malay folklore

Pelesit (Malay pronunciation: [pələsit]) is a type of familiar spirit in Malay folklore. It is generally a cricket, or occasionally a grasshopper. The term literally means "buzzer" from the root word lesit meaning to buzz or whizz, as an insect does. They are also called Palasik.

Belief in the pelesit traces back to Malay animism before the introduction of monotheism. Generally speaking, a pelesit can only be owned by a woman, and were said to have been prevalent in Kedah. The male equivalent is another hereditary spirit, the bajang. Due to the similarity, the two are sometimes confused in folklore.

== In literature and popular culture ==
- The pelesit is one of many ghosts and spirits mentioned by Munshi Abdullah in his book Hikayat Abdullah, to the amusement of his employer Stamford Raffles.
- In Kijiya, a Malaysian komku series, the Pelesit are demonic creatures that serve as the series' main antagonists

== See also ==
- Hantu Raya
- Polong
- Toyol
