= Pocong vs Kuntilanak =

2008 film by David Purnomo

- Directed by: David Purnomo
- Written by: David Purnomo
- Produced by: Zainal Susanto
- Starring: Ahmad Zaki; Alia Rosa; Aldiansyah Taher
- Distributed by: Mitra Pictures
- Release date: 6 November 2008
- Running time: 90 minutes
- Country: Indonesia
- Language: Indonesian
- Budget: N/A

Pocong vs Kuntilanak is a 2008 Indonesian horror film, directed and written by David Purnomo, and produced by Zainal Susanto. The main cast consists of Ahmad Zaki, Alia Rosa, and Aldiansyah Taher.

== Plot ==
The film begins during the Dutch colonial era in Indonesia, where Raden Soekotjo plans to confess his love to Nyi Soroh. He discovers that she has fallen in love with and married a Dutch sea captain, Von Klingen. Enraged, Raden kills Nyi, awakening her family's Kuntilanak spirit guardian.

Raden confronts Von Klingen but discovers that the Kuntilanak is hunting him. It eventually kills him, but before his death he instructs a relative not to untie the rope around his pocong burial shroud, as doing so would allow him to become a Pocong spirit. Over generations, the Soekotjo and Von Klingen families become locked in a supernatural feud between the Pocong and Kuntilanak. The story eventually shifts to the present, focusing on their descendants, Marcell Soekotjo and Vonny Von Klingen.

Vonny is a high-school student whose best friends are Bi and Noo. Noo is dating Sa, whose best friend, Big, works as a tattoo artist for Marcell. After visiting Big and Marcell at the tattoo parlour, the girls go to Vonny's house, where Sa persuades them to summon a Pocong.

Meanwhile, the Kuntilanak recognises Vonny as its new host and goes to her home to protect her. Its appearance terrifies the group, who call upon the Pocong for help. The Pocong drives the Kuntilanak away temporarily, but the encounter reignites the ancient feud.

Seeking answers, Vonny consults her grandmother, who explains that she must accept and control the Kuntilanak or it will continue its violent rampage. The Pocong later possesses Marcell and uses him to confront the Kuntilanak. When Vonny and Marcell meet Marcell's mother, Agnes, she reveals that the only way to end the curse is for Vonny to marry Marcell.

Having developed deep affection for Marcell, Vonny agrees and accepts his ring. The rope binding the Pocong is untied, freeing Marcell from its control. The Kuntilanak disappears, and Vonny and her family are finally freed from the threat of the Soekotjo family and the supernatural feud.

== Cast ==
- Ahmed Zaki
- Allya Rossa
- Aldiansyah Taher
- Ikhasan Samiaji
- Puspita Diana
- Amanda Faried
