= Manseren Manggoendi =

Figure in Folklore

Manseren Manggoendi or Manseren Manggundi is a mythical hero, originating from the Numfor-Biak region of Papua, Indonesia. Manseren Manggoendi's purpose is to recreate the world. His return will be preceded by the prophet Konor, who will announce his arrival.
