= Babi ngepet =

Boar demon in Indonesian mythology

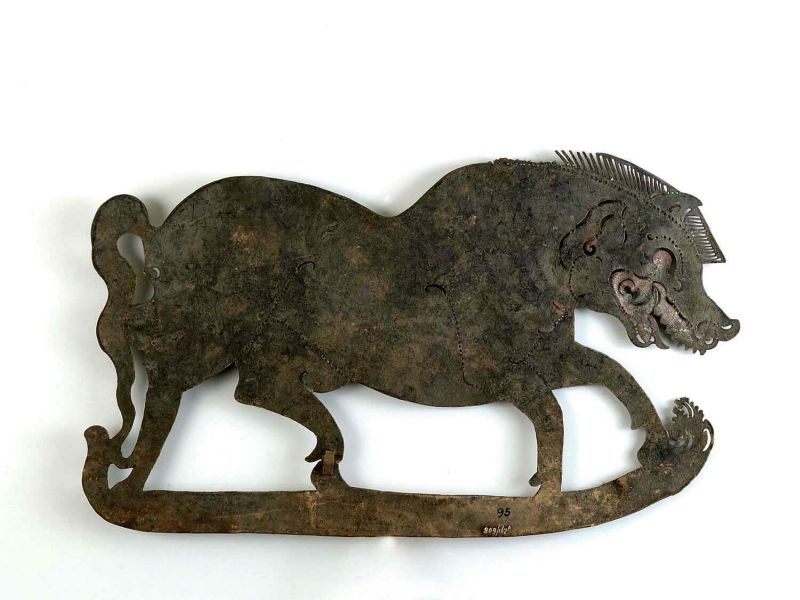
Wayang kulit representation of a wild boar.

Babi ngepet (Indonesian pronunciation: [ˌbabi ˈŋɛpɛt̪̚]) is boar demon in Indonesian mythology. Babi ngepet are commonly known in Java and Bali.

== Outline ==
According to local myth, the creature is believed to be the manifestation of a person practising pesugihan babi black magic. Pesugihan is derived from the Javanese word sugih meaning "rich". It is a kind of magic to make people become rich instantly, but in exchange, they must sacrifice something. In this case, they must sacrifice their humanity, allowing themselves to be transformed into a boar for some time, or allowing themselves to be possessed by a boar demon. The human-animal transformation is similar to shapeshifting or the werewolf concept in the West.

== Transformation ==
Some myths tell of a man enveloped in black robes who miraculously transforms into a creature. After the transformation, the demon boar roams the village, scratching its body against walls, doors, cupboards, and furniture. Magically, the belongings of the villagers, such as money, gold, and jewelry, disappear and are carried away by the Babi Ngepet. If the mission is successful, by the time the Babi Ngepet safely returns home and transforms back into human form, the black robes will be filled with the stolen money and jewelry.

The person that practices Babi Ngepet black magic needs assistance from another person. The assistant's task is to stay home and guard the lit candle floating on a basin of water while the Babi Ngepet is in action. If the candle flame is shaking, fading or almost out, it is a sign that the Babi Ngepet is in danger, caught in the act by villagers, or turned back into their human form. Because of this belief, Javanese villagers often chase or even kill any boar wandering around the village at night.

== Interpretation ==
The skeptical view is that it was probably a traditional way to explain the unexplainable loss of fortune or a mysterious theft in the village by blaming the wild boar roaming the village in the night. Probably, it was a traditional means of pest control to get rid of wild boars from eating and destroying rice fields or barns. The association of the boar with magic concerning fortune probably originated from Javanese pre-Islamic and pre-Hindu-Buddhist beliefs that associate the boar with domestic richness, fortune and prosperity, similar to its connections with Celengan, which means piggy bank in Javanese. The word Celengan is derived from word Celeng which means boar.

== See also ==
- Aswang
- Tuyul
- Werewolf
