= Orang Minyak =

Malaysian ghost

In Malay ghost beliefs, the Orang Minyak ("oily man" in Malay) is a supernatural creature coated with shiny black grease who abducts young women by night. The legend of the figure is first mentioned in a report from the Singaporean newspaper Berita Harian dated 12 October 1957.

== Legends ==
According to Malay legend, Orang Minyak is a creature that abducts young women by night. Supposedly, the creature is able to climb walls and grab victims while evading capture due to its slippery coating. The coating was first described as consisting of hair oil, before later stories evolved into it being covered in coconut oil and soot; the genre movies have it covered in crude oil reflecting the local industrial advancements at the time. According to some folklorists, the Orang Minyak has been alternately described as appearing naked, or wearing "a black pair of swimming trunks". A number of stories describe the Orang Minyak as a rapist that only targets virgins. The Orang Minyak has been traditionally blamed for rapes, beginning in the 1950s, and superstitious Malay female students would attempt to ward off the creature by donning sweaty clothing "to give the appearance of someone who had just been with a man".

Some versions of the legend hold that the Orang Minyak is an evil human warlock rather than a supernatural creature. Science writer Benjamin Radford described the tales as "rooted in myth and folklore" and characterized the creature's supposed abilities as "implausible". According to Radford, "if a person actually covered himself that way, greasy hands and feet would make it difficult to turn doorknobs or run around, not to mention crawl up the sides of buildings or grab a struggling captive".

In one version of the legend, popularised in the 1958 film Sumpah Orang Minyak (The Curse of the Oily Man) directed by and starring P. Ramlee, the Orang Minyak was a man who was cursed in an attempt to win back his love with magic. According to the story, the devil offered to help the creature and give him powers of the black arts, but only if the Orang Minyak worshipped him and raped 21 virgins within a week. In another version, the creature is under control of an evil shaman or witch doctor.

Malaysian newspapers occasionally report claimed sightings of the Orang Minyak. In 2012, the residents in Kampung (Village) Laksamana, in Gombak, Selangor, Malaysia, claimed to have seen and heard the creature in the vicinity of the Pangsapuri Laksamana and Jalan Laksamana. Several years earlier, local newspapers carried sensational reports of a knife-wielding rapist covered in oil, ostensibly in imitation of the Orang Minyak.

Singaporean writer Yogesh Tulsi comments that the orang minyak's depictions slathered in crude oil represents traditional ways of life ruined by a "horrific petromodernity".

== In popular culture ==
The legend has appeared in a number of films, including:

- Orang Minyak (1958), directed by L. Krishnan
- Sumpah Orang Minyak (1958), directed by P. Ramlee
- Serangan Orang Minyak (1958), directed by L. Krishnan
- Oily Maniac (1976), from the Shaw Brothers, directed by Meng Hua Ho
- Orang Minyak (2007)
- Pontianak vs Orang Minyak (2012), directed by Afdlin Shauki
- Men Who Save the World (Lelaki Harapan Dunia) (2014), directed by Liew Seng Tat

== See also ==
- Ghosts in Malay culture
