= Pawang =

Shaman from Indonesia and Malaysia

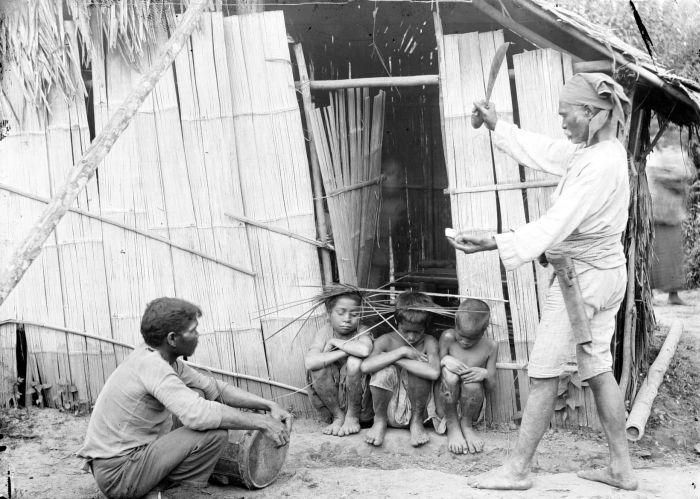
South Moluccan shaman exorcising evil spirits occupying children, Buru, Indonesia. (1920)

A pawang is a type of shaman from Indonesia and Malaysia. The pawang deals with magic involving weather, wild animals and spirits, but they may also be employed for cases of sorcery. Pawang are usually associated with mountains and sky in contrast to the traditional healers (dukun or bomoh) who are most often linked to rivers.

Particular variations of pawang exist. Some specialise in controlling weather such as the pawang hujan (rain pawang). Others prevent attacks from animals (especially a dangerous ones) such as the pawang harimau (tiger pawang) and the pawang buaya (crocodile pawang). Some of them are able to do particular rituals and chants for ensuring good luck, such as bountiful hunt, having a safe trip, or success in mining or construction.

A pawang is said to control elements and entities by chanting and usually by having spirit servants to do his bidding. Practitioners believe the spirits can perform healings, seek missing persons and things or even investigate reasons for bad luck. They further claim that spirits can be used to possess people, cause sickness and miseries and many other bad things.

The British colonial administrator Frank Swettenham wrote about the role of the pawang in late nineteenth century Malaya in a chapter on 'Malay Superstitions' in his volume of essays Malay Sketches (1895). Swettenham described how the supposed victim of a bajang would employ a pawang to use various methods to determine the identity of their attacker, such as scraping an iron bowl with a razor to produce a corresponding loss of hair in the guilty party, divination by use of a water bowl or dowsing.

== See also ==
- Animism in Malaysia
- Bomoh
- Dukun
- Shaman
