= Jenglot =

Miniature of Indonesian mythology and folklore

A jenglot (Indonesian pronunciation: [ˈdʒɛŋlɔt]) is a small creature of Indonesian culture and mythology. It has the appearance of a deformed humanoid doll and whose size is up to 12 centimetres (4.7 in) in length. They have long hair which grows sparse and stiff through the legs, and long nails. The doll itself does nothing, but when imbued with black magic, is said to provide protection to its master, takes revenge on an enemy or works as a good luck charm. It can fetch thousands of ringgit or millions of rupiah when sold.

Folklore states that they were formerly human beings. Jenglot 'keepers' feed their creature with blood, either animal blood (goat) or human blood. The blood is placed near the jenglot, which is said not to drink the blood directly. According to traditional belief, the jenglot will get the nutrients of the blood in their own way.

== Exhibition ==
In Indonesia there have been several "exhibitions" of jenglot specimens found and showcased. Most are found on the islands of Java and Sumatra, and are held as private collections of supernatural researchers and fans. People who have caught the jenglot usually bring their creature all over Indonesia to exhibit them in order to gain money. They have also been shown at "Pameran Misteri, Jin, Hantu dan Keranda" at Sultan Alam Shah Museum, Shah Alam. Others still maintain that they are no more than "man-made toys [with] no supernatural power."

== Hoax ==
Many have been found to be hoaxes, being taxidermist composites of monkeys and fish, however, not all specimens were examined, and the jenglot is an actively believed myth that many natives believe to be real. In 2008, scientists in Malaysia examined hairs and DNA from four jenglots brought from Irian Jaya, Indonesia to Kuala Lumpur, Malaysia by a businessman to be exhibited in a local museum. Each of the samples appeared to be from humans and DNA analysis showed it was likely from the same person. They even noted that "A few hairs from samples [...] also had an intact dried root at the other end of the cut tip, which indicated that the hairs were implanted upside down on the Jenglots' heads".

== See also ==
- Jenny Haniver
- Pontianak
- Toyol
