= Hantu Air =

Southeast Asian water spirit

Hantu Air, Puaka Air or Mambang Air is the Malay translation for Spirit of the Water or Water Ghost, which according to animist traditions in Maritime Southeast Asia, is the unseen inhabitant of watery places such as rivers, lakes, seas, swamps and even ditches. Communication between humans and Hantu Air occurs in situations based on the well-being of an environment and can be positive or negative. Water spirits are called on and communicated with through ceremonies, rituals, incantations, and in extreme cases exorcisms. Hantu Air is associated with bad things happening to people including people going missing, drowning, flooding and many other incidents.

== Origin ==
The identification of incantations and rituals can be derived from the indigenous, Hindu, or Islamic origins. These origins influenced the cultural belief that everything contained a supernatural soul or essence. For a long time animism and dinamism were widely practiced in Maritime Southeast Asia. Locals would associate almost anything with the spiritual world, including nature. The civilization of Maritime Southeast Asia believed that the well-being and success of humans was dependent on the spirits which inhabited the environment. The spirits are considered powerful entities that spread throughout the environment and are identified as being either good or evil.

Determining whether a spirit is good or evil depends on the interaction between spirit and human. A positive interaction invokes the benevolent spirits which are treated similar to pets and help their owners with endeavors. This relationship is a mutual companionship to maintain the well-being of an environment. A negative interaction invokes the malevolent spirits which cause disease.

Negative associations commonly occur when the spirits are disturbed from their home. In that case, one's health would decline and may become very ill. A pawang would have to identify the spirit, address the issue, and correct the wrongdoing. Then the person who became ill can heal and return to proper health. Based on the severity of harm done from the malevolent spirits, the pawang can either peaceful negotiate with the spirits or exorcize them. To conduct an exorcism, the pawang may need to perform a seance to cleanse evil influence off a person, object, or place. This includes purification and neutralization processes.

Hantu Air is used to explain any sickness or death associated with watery areas that cannot be otherwise explained. Some people believe that spirits discarded by their previous owners will haunt places associated with water. The unguided and lost spirit roams the area and feeds on anything available, including humans.

Superstitions arising among the locals tell of this evil spirit dwelling in watery places where it sometimes disguises itself as an old tree trunk, a beautiful lady, fish or other animals in order to lure people into its trap. When caught the human will be eaten or drowned.

Currently, deaths near watery areas are attributed to outbreaks of Leptospirosis, instead of Hantu Air.

== Contemporary customs ==
A ceremony called Semah Pantai was once popular among local older Malays, especially in the East Coast of Malaysia. It is a ceremony whereby fishermen and seafarers honor the sea spirits and ask for blessings and protection when they fish at sea. The ritual is used in times of uncertainty or chance. Common practices include chants, small sacrifices, and the use of charms. The people of Malay with the specialties of fishing, navigation, and sailing are called pawang dl-laut or pawang of the sea. The pawang has experience and knowledge that displays the qualifications needed to perform the ceremony. The last ceremony was undertaken on 22 April 1960. The ceremony usually took place every three years and lasted seven days and nights.

Expert fishermen perform rituals as a type of humble communication with the sea spirits asking to guide them to locations with an abundance of fish. During poor fishing seasons in coastal villages, the Semah Pantai ceremony calls on the spirits of the sea in the hope that fish will be provided. In other instances, navigators have been known to stand on the bow of their ship and call on the sea spirits for assistance and guidance when in treacherous or rocky waters. Communication with Hantu Air also occurred when water was needed as a resource for irrigation of crops. Specifically in Maritime Southeast Asia, rice-fields were the main crop source and needed a plentiful amount of irrigation to support the inhabitants. Water spirits were called on when the rivers ran dry from droughts and rituals were often performed.

If the Hantu Air feels threatened by the sailors and fishermen, signs will be shown through of lack of fish or deadly seas storms. In extreme cases, Hantu Air is believed to disguise itself as a creature of the sea and drown the people invading its space.

== See also ==
- Hantu Demon
