= Pocong =

Javanese ghost from folklore

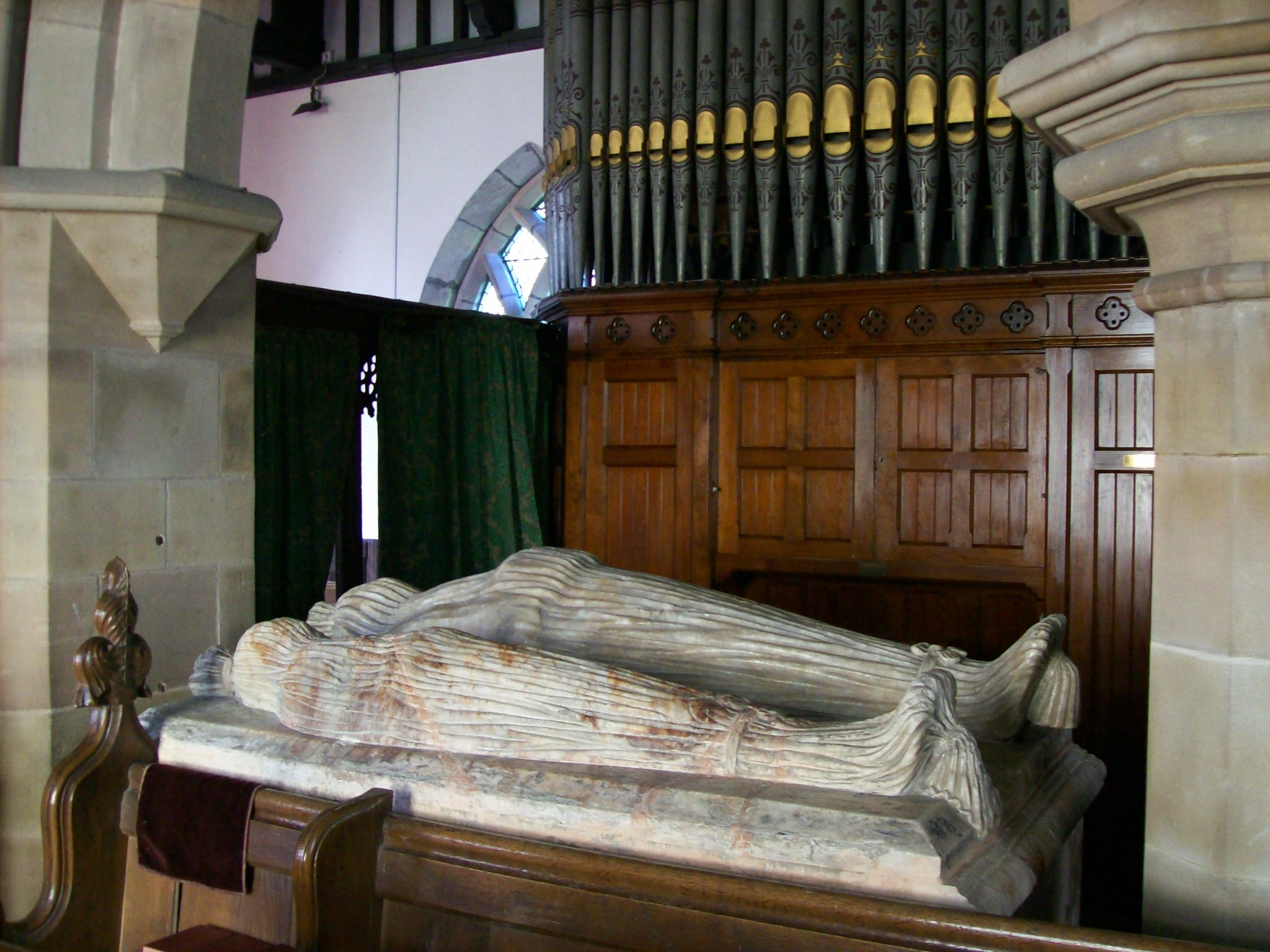

Creature information
- Other name(s): hantu bungkus (Malay), bobongkong (Banten Sundanese), Kende-Kende (Sama-Bajau)

Origin
- Country: Indonesia
- Region: Origin; Central and eastern part of Java: Popularity; Nationwide Indonesia and countries with significant Javanese diaspora

Pocong (Indonesian pronunciation: [pɔ't͡ʃɔŋ] puh-chong; from Javanese: ꦥꦺꦴꦕꦺꦴꦁ, romanized: pocong, lit. 'wrapped-in-shroud') is a ghost that resembles a dead body wrapped in a shroud. In Islamic funerals, a shroud called a kain kafan (in Indonesian and Malay) is used to wrap the body of the dead person. The dead body is covered in a white fabric that is tied over the head, under the feet, and around the neck. The shroud is firmly secured at multiple points to ensure it stays in place during the journey to the gravesite. Upon placement in the grave, it is believed that the knots must be undone; otherwise, the corpse will animate and become known as a Pocong. Pocong is also known in Malaysia as Hantu Bungkus (wrapped-up ghost).

== Physical appearance ==
Pocongs come in all shapes and sizes, depending not only on the physical appearance of the deceased at the time of death, but also on the state of the corpse's decomposition as well. The pocong of a person who has been dead for years would be more skeletal in appearance, whereas the pocong of a recently deceased person would retain a fair resemblance to his or her former self, save for some minor decomposition. Typically, a 'fresh' pocong is described as having a pale face and wide open eyes. Multiple sources mention a pocong with dark face and glowing red eyes, a decayed pocong with white featureless eye, and a flat-faced pocong with empty eye sockets. Most pocongs also hop like rabbits due to the knot under their feet, which prevents the ghosts from walking. This is often how fake pocong are distinguished from real ones in Indonesian fiction: if the creature is hopping around, it is not a real ghost but a living person disguised as one. They are said to move by floating above the ground. This is the distinction that people tend to look for when they encounter a pocong in the wild.

== Behavior ==
Since not all pocongs are the same, it is difficult to pinpoint a specific trait of all pocongs. Some pocongs may show themselves in front of people to relay messages or ask for prayers with no intention to cause harm whatsoever. At the same time, others may not be so docile, actively taking pleasure in frightening people with their grotesque looks. Still, in the main, their behaviors are mostly unpredictable, and people are encouraged not to think of them as allies, but rather as supernatural beings to be treated with caution.

Pocongs may form colonies, which could number from a few dozen to a few thousand ghosts for each colony. Despite this, judging from anecdotal records, most sightings of pocong indicate a "lone wolf" style attack, meaning they tend to act independently. It is rare for pocongs to work in pairs or in groups to harass humans.

As pocongs are not bound to the physical world like humans are, they can move freely through solid objects. They have also been observed to teleport almost instantly from one place to another. They are found practically anywhere, from their final resting places to their former homes. However, banana trees seem to be their preferred spot, it is not uncommon for someone to find a small colony of pocongs happily gathering near or around banana trees, but primarily are known to roam and gather during the night.

== Stories ==
In some parts of Indonesia, there are pocong variants that are unique to the places from which they emerged. One of such creatures is known as the plastic pocong that haunts Jakarta. The plastic pocong's origin is traced to the purportedly true story of a pregnant woman who was murdered in cold blood by her boyfriend. When an autopsy was performed on the murdered woman's body, blood kept flowing endlessly from her body even after it was sewn shut. So much blood was pouring out that the hospital staff were compelled to wrap the corpse in plastic in addition to the traditional shroud, before burying her remains in an undisclosed location. People believed the plastic pocong appeared because the murdered woman's soul wished to be freed from her plastic cover.

In 2007–2008, the story of an andong pocong surfaced in Sidoarjo, East Java, where the ghost was depicted as a lone pocong riding a carriage drawn by a ghostly horse. The arrival of the andong pocong is heralded with a sound of eerie bells. The ghost would knock on the doors of people's homes during the darkest hours of the night, and those who answer to the door would be afflicted by a mysterious illness before dying a few days later. The andong pocong story originated from the story of a young man, who loved the daughter of a rich debt collector. Unfortunately, the girl's parents disapproved their marriage due to their social differences. However, the young man's mother approved of them, and they were married on the next week. Unknown to them, however, one of the debt collector's subordinates witnessed the ceremony, and ran home to inform the father. Enraged, the father gathered a mob and rushed towards the marriage ceremony. When they arrived, the ceremony had been concluded, with the married couple riding a horse cart, also known as an Andong. They chased the newly-wedded couple until suddenly they were hit by a passing truck, killing both and the horse instantly. Refusing to rest, the young man's soul rose from his grave. With his horse and cart, he began haunting the Sidoarjo region.

Pocong Merah or red shroud ghost is arguably the most feared pocong variant due to its violent and dangerous nature, despite its rarity. It is said to be born out of a person who wished to seek revenge for an unpleasant death, making it more akin to a vengeful spirit often found in many folklores in the West. The red color of this pocong's shroud is associated with the feeling of bitterness, anger, and vengeance felt by the person during the final moments of life. Of all variants of pocongs, the red pocong is believed to be more likely to attack the living on sight and without provocation. Because of this, many believe the red pocongs are kings, or leaders of some sort, of a colony of pocongs.

In the rural parts of Yogyakarta, the Code River is said to be inhabited by a massive colony of pocongs numbering in the thousands. The colony itself is led by a very peculiar red pocong, who lived as an early 20th century local shaman specializing in black magic. According to the story, the shaman's shady lifestyle and practices greatly disturbed the villagers living in the same village. One day they decided that they would not tolerate him any longer, and so they hunted him down, murdered him in cold blood, and mutilated his body. The body parts were later wrapped in large white shroud, which later turned red because of the blood from the shaman's body, and buried somewhere in a pine forest near the riverbank. In death, the shaman swore revenge on the villagers who had slaughtered him in cold blood, and so his vengeful spirit, alongside thousands of pocongs he has 'recruited' over the years, has been haunting the Code River to this very day.

== Popular culture ==
Pocong are a stock of movies or TV serials (sinetron), especially those of the horror genre. In the early 2000s (decade), TV stations in Indonesia purported to capture ghost appearances with their cameras and put the recordings on a specific show of their own. In these shows, Pocong feature prominently, along with the kuntilanak.

There was also a movie Pocong (2006) directed by Rudy Soedjarwo, which was banned and censored in its French and German DVD versions due to the disturbing, scary, and terrifying scenes. Not long after it was banned, the director created a sequel, less horrible but about the same story, Pocong 2 (2006). Other titles such as Pocong 3 (2007), 40 Hari Bangkitnya Pocong (2008), Pocong vs Kuntilanak and The Real Pocong (2009) were aired.

The movie Pocong Jumat Kliwon, directed by successful director Nayato Fio Nuala, began a trend of horror comedy Pocong movies. In 2011 Pocong is also Pocong, a new horror-comedy featuring Pocong, was made by female director Chiska Doppert, Nayato's former partner.

Other recent movies featuring Pocong are Sumpah, (Ini) Pocong! (2009), Pocong Setan Jompo (2009), Kepergok Pocong (2011) and Pocong the Origin (2019). These films generally share the quality of the pocong playing a role similar to that of the Grim Reaper, in both comedic and dramatic situations.

In the small area of Kepuh Village in 2020, locals dressed up in Pocong costumes as patrols to promote more people into social distancing during the peak of the COVID-19 pandemic in Indonesia.

== See also ==
- Revenant
- Undead
- Zombie
- Jiangshi
- Wiedergänger
