= Hantu (supernatural creature) =

Malay and Indonesian word for spirit or ghost

Hantu is the Malay and Indonesian word for spirit or ghost. In modern usage it generally means spirits of the dead but has also come to refer to any legendary invisible being, such as demons. In its traditional context the term also referred to animistic nature spirits or ancestral souls. The word is derived from Proto-Malayo-Polynesian *qanitu and Proto-Austronesian *qaNiCu. Cognates in other Austronesian languages include the Micronesian aniti, Lio language nitu, Yami anito, Taivoan alid, Seediq and Atayal utux, Bunun hanitu or hanidu, Polynesian aitu or atua, and Tsou hicu among the Formosan languages. In terms of concept and place in traditional folklore, it is most similar to the Filipino anito.

== Types ==
Aside from generic spirits of the dead, there exist various forms of hantu including both the benign and malevolent.

- Hantu Air: spirit inhabiting the water
- Hantu Beruk: ape demon
- Hantu Belian: tiger spirit
- Hantu Musang: a civet cat spirit that is invoked in a game of possession
- Hantu Pusaka: grave demon
- Hantu Raya: great demon. This hantu is considered the strongest among evil spirits of the jungles of Malaysia, and takes the appearance of its owner.
- Hantu Rimba: deep-forest demon
- Hantu Tinggi: tall hantu that is associated with trees
- Kuntilanak: a woman who died in childbirth and kills women and children, often regarded as one of the most feared and malevolent hantu.

== See also ==
- Ghosts in Malay culture
- Anito
