= Bomoh =

Malay shaman and traditional medicine practitioner

A bomoh (Jawi: توء بوموه) is a Malay shaman and traditional medicine practitioner. The term is used mainly in Malaysia and parts of Sumatra and Borneo, whereas most Indonesians use the word dukun. It is often mistranslated into English as medicine man or witch doctor. In colloquial usage, the term bomoh is often interchangeable with another type of shaman or dukun, the pawang, but they generally serve different functions. The bomoh is primarily a healer, herbalist, geomancer, and sorcerer. The pawang on the other hand usually specialises in rituals involving weather, nature, animals, and a good harvest. Their roles do overlap, however, and both claim to act as intermediaries for the spirits and gods.

== Etymology ==
The word bomoh (at times spelled bomo or bomor) has been in common usage since at least classical times. This word can mean either doctor or sorcerer. Prior to the later introduction of the English-derived "doktor" or the Arabic word "tabib", the bomoh served as healers and physicians in Malay society. Thai shamans or bomoh Siam are traditionally held in high regard in Malaysia. Malay texts such as the Hikayat Aceh (1600-1625) record the word bomoh simply as mo or moh.

Hikayat Aceh 127:7 "... gajah tuanku ini. Diperhamba suruh ubati kepada [bo]mo gajah tuanku. Berilah makanannya."

Hikayat Aceh 127:7 "... this king's elephant. The king asked it to be treated by the elephant [bo]moh. Give it food."

== Background ==
Shamanism in Southeast Asia can be traced to the region's prehistoric tribal people. The bomoh's original role was that of a healer and their expertise was first and foremost an in-depth knowledge of medicinal herbs and tajul muluk or Malay geomancy. This was supplemented by Sanskrit mantera (mantra) owing to the ancient Hindu-Buddhist influence in the region. Before European colonisation, bomoh - along with Buddhist monks and Hindu rishis - were often exempt from paying taxes, due to the fact that many of them had few material belongings.

=== Modern era ===
The bomoh's craft retained large animist and Hindu elements from before the Malays' embrace of Islam even after Islam became dominant, but the acceptance of bomoh in Malay society greatly decreased during the Islamization in the 1970s and 80s. Bomoh were then seen as deviating from Islam because of their invocation of hantu and dewa-dewi and the potentially harmful black magic they were accused of practicing. This period saw a drastic decline in traditional herbalism, and many fraudulent practitioners filled the void. As a result, bomoh are today looked at with suspicion even though they are still commonly consulted for personal reasons. Many bomoh have adapted their practice in the context of modern Islam, such as reciting verses of the Quran or invoking the Names of Allah, but this is viewed as shallow by conservative shamans.

== Cosmology and function ==
Malay metaphysical theory holds that the body, and in fact the universe itself, is made up of the four classical elements of fire, water, earth, and wind. Illnesses are often said to be caused by an imbalance of these elements. To restore this balance, patients are advised to bathe in cool water to which lime juice is added. The bomoh also works with rituals and incantations, called jampi.

=== Spirits ===
Some bomoh use cemeteries to summon spirits to fulfill requests by supplicants, while others only deal with a single spirit. It is said that sometimes the bomoh selects the spirit, while other times, it is the spirit who selects the bomoh. Spirits are said to be able to heal the sick, seek missing persons or even investigate reasons for bad luck. Spirits can also be used to attack people, cause sickness and misery and many other bad things. Bomoh who have a particular religion may incorporate their religious practices into their craft.

Traditionally, healing rituals of some bomoh involved music and dance, such as the main puteri or main peteri (a trance-dance from Kelantan and Terengganu often connected to mak yong), the main lukah (a fisherman's dance from Pahang), and the main saba (which re-enacts the heavenly princesses [puteri kayangan] dancing around a saba tree). The music is played by an assistant called the tuk minduk.

== In popular culture ==
=== The bomoh of MH370 ===
In 2014, shortly after the disappearance of Malaysia Airlines Flight 370, Dato Mahaguru Ibrahim Mat Zin, who proclaimed himself as the Raja Bomoh ("Bomoh King") with a male assistant, appeared in public offering to locate the missing plane by conducting a series of rituals at the Kuala Lumpur International Airport. The ritual involved using a pair of bamboo binoculars to view the inside of a traditional fish trap. Ibrahim claimed that the plane was "suspended in the air" amongst the Philippines, South China Sea and on an unidentified country, and it was hidden by the orang bunian, a humanoid race akin to elves in Malay legend. Beside the ritual, Ibrahim Mat Zin also stated that 100,000 seni gayong martial artists had performed prayers for the missing plane and its passengers.

A few days later, Ibrahim Mat Zin and his four assistants, three males and one female, came to KLIA, bringing along a gourd, water from the Zamzam Well in Mecca, a small surat Ya Sin book and several other items to conduct another ritual. This time, he used two coconuts and knocked them against each other with his two bare hands while shouting the takbir. Then, his three male assistants sat on the "magic carpet" and using a number of "magical artifacts" such as a walking stick, a basket and two coconuts, and thus started the infamous scene, while local and international photographers took a few shots. Ibrahim Mat Zin claimed that the purpose of the ritual is to weaken the spirits' hold on the plane.

The incidents drew international attention, eventually becoming the subject of a video game titled Bomoh: Rescue Run and developed by Triapps, which surpassed more than 100,000 downloads in Google Play. Minister for Youth and Sports Khairy Jamaluddin, who was not amused by the activities of the bomoh, tweeted in regards to the incident: "Somebody should arrest those magic carpet bomohs. Memalukan (humiliating)". He even resorted to contacting Jamil Khir Baharom, the Minister for Islamic Affairs, to deal with the bomoh, as the Malaysian Department of Islamic Advancement had issued a fatwa that Ibrahim Mat Zin's methods contradict Islamic teachings. Some netizens had also pointed out the similarities of the antics of the bomoh with a scene in the P. Ramlee movie Laksamana Do Re Mi where the main characters ride on a flying mat, while the bamboo binoculars session once held by Ibrahim Mat Zin to locate the missing plane mimic Re's magic single vision binocular in the movie.

=== Strained relations between Malaysia and North Korea ===
In 2017, the very same Bomoh from the flight MH370 ritual conducted a ritual in what he perceived to protect Malaysia from North Korea in wake of the strained tensions between the two nations.

== See also ==
- Dukun
- Malaysian folk religion
- Pawang
