= Hantu Raya =

Spirit in Malay folklore

The Hantu Raya is a type of familiar spirit in Malay folklore that acts as a double for black magic practitioners. Roughly meaning "great ghost", it is supposed to bestow great power onto its master. Its true form according to folktale is humanoid form with black hairy body except the facial area, rough grey skin, long sharp teeth and with red eyes.

== Etymology ==
The word hantu is most often translated as ghost in modern Malay, but is actually closer in meaning to "spirit". The word raya roughly means "great" or "high". The term hantu raya (therefore meaning "great ghost") is sometimes mistaken as meaning a supreme demon which rules over all ghosts, but its high status comes not from its position and instead refers to the spirit's power, being one of the most useful of spirit familiars.

== Functions ==
The Hantu Raya manifests itself in the physical form as a double of its owner. In this form it can be used to work in the fields in its owner's place. This was said to be especially useful since the Hantu Raya possesses superhuman strength and can work more efficiently than mortals.

The Hantu Raya could also be used as an alibi if the owner were to commit a crime. If a man were to have an extra-marital affair, the Hantu Raya could stay with his wife in his place

Normally the Hantu Raya feasts on ancak, an offering made for the spirits, containing yellow glutinous rice, eggs, roasted chicken, rice flakes and a doll. Food offerings must strictly be observed in a timely manner, to avoid any harm caused by the spirit.

The Hantu Raya is also blamed for childbirth death, which was quite common in the days before modern medicine.

== Film ==
Jangan Pandang Belakang (meaning "Don't Look Back") is a Malay horror movie based on the Hantu Raya. The story is about a young man named Darma (Pierre Andre) who tries to find out the truth about the death of his fiancée, Rose. A Malay family has a familiar spirit in the form of a hantu raya which can make them richer, stronger or whatever they desire, but it asks something in return. It will haunt or otherwise disturb their descendants unless somebody does something about it, like contain it or removing it altogether from the family.

== See also ==
- Genderuwo
- Pelesit
- Polong
- Toyol
