= Dukun =

Indonesian term for shaman

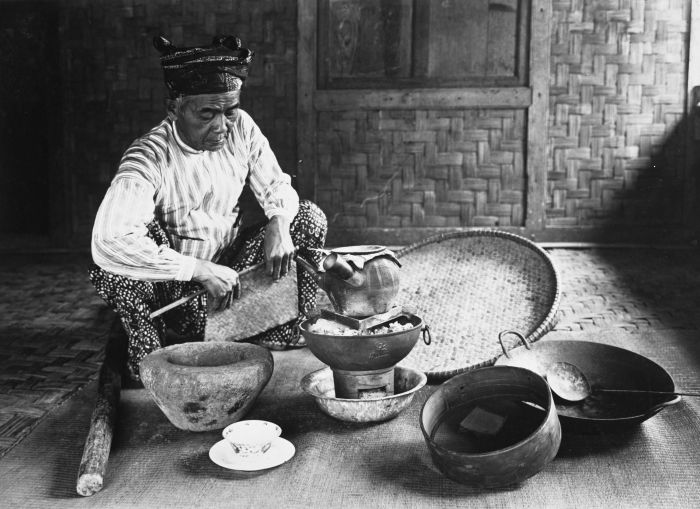
A dukun preparing traditional medicine (Dutch colonial period, 1910–1940)

Dukun is an Indonesian term for shaman. Their societal role is that of a traditional healer, spirit medium, custom and tradition experts and on occasion sorcerers and masters of black magic (witchcraft). In common usage the dukun is often confused with another type of shaman, the pawang. It is often mistranslated into English as "witch doctor" or "medicine man". Many self-styled dukun in Indonesia are simply scammers and criminals, preying on people who were raised to believe in the supernatural.

The dukun is the very epitome of the kejawen or kebatinan belief system indigenous to Java. Very strong and ancient beliefs of animism, ancestor worship and shamanism are held by the people of the Nusantara. While medical doctors and revivalist Islam and Christianity have caused a decrease in the prominence of dukun, they remain highly respected and somewhat feared figures in Indonesian society, even in the most orthodox Muslim-dominant areas. In the pre-colonial past, dukun were exempt from paying taxes, as with Hindu priests and Buddhist monks.

Many highly prominent and highly educated Indonesians, Malaysians and Singaporeans, even those with Western doctorate and masters levels degrees will still consult dukun or soothsayers. Indonesians who are known to have employed dukun include former President Sukarno, former president Suharto, former president Megawati Sukarnoputri, Sultan Hamengkubuwana IX and Sultan Hamengkubuwana X and many more.

Dukun are most common on the island of Java, though the island of Madura is especially feared for being very powerful practitioners of dark magic, and Bali is well regarded for its dukun. The Dayak people of Kalimantan are also feared for their use of dukun when head-hunting. In Sabah, the Kadayan community are known for their dukun who are said to look waif-like with red eyes.

In common practice, a dukun is consulted when a person perceives they have an issue that has a supernatural or paranormal association. If a dukun is not known to the individual, their family or friends, word of mouth often creates a situation where the dukun will appear as if summoned, most especially in the case of possessions.

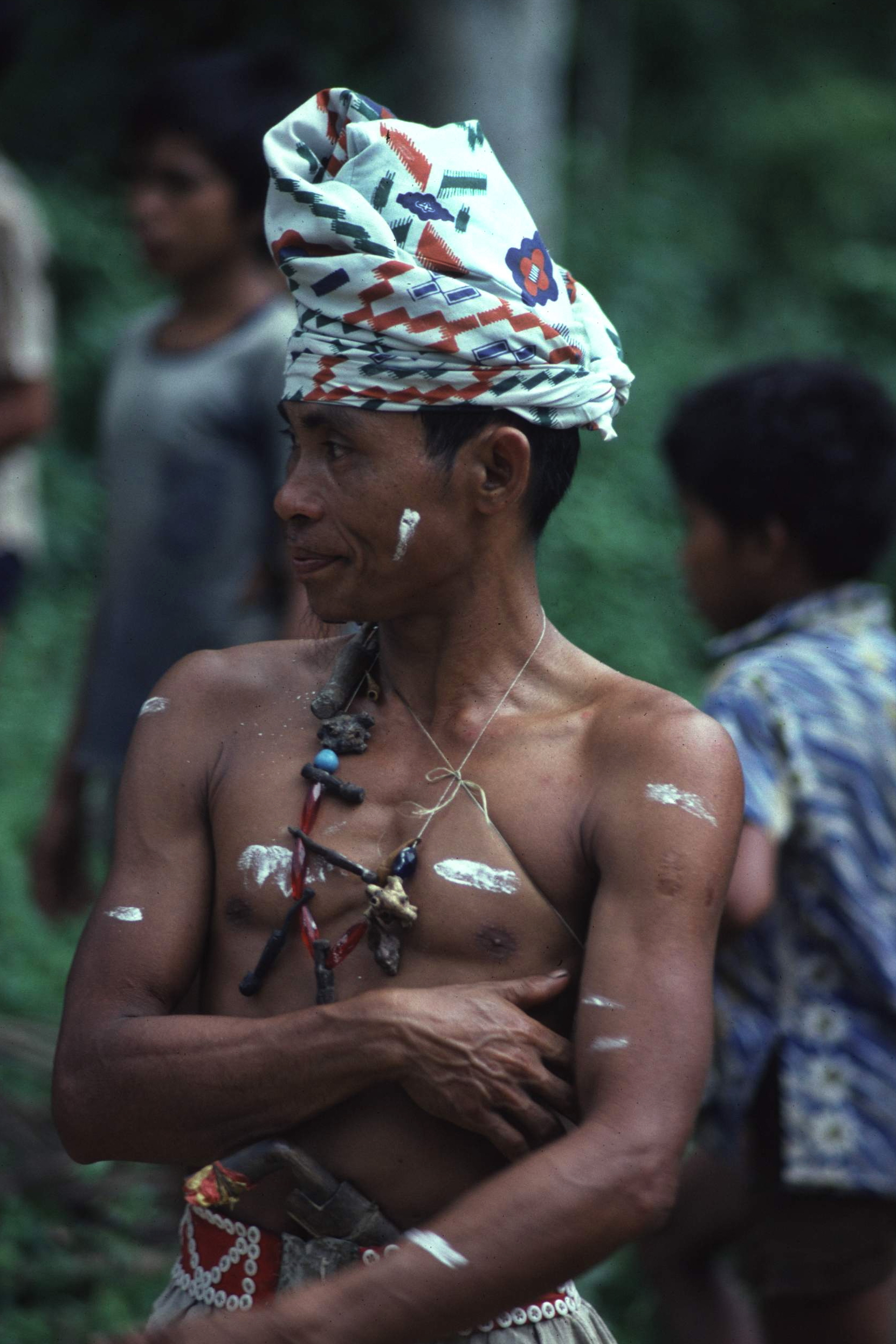
Dayak shaman, East Kalimantan.

== Becoming a dukun ==
The dukun's knowledge is passed down orally, but the specific customs differ from one community to another. Initiates may voluntarily decide to learn the dukun's craft, or the position might be inherited. Proto-Malay dukun often serve the dual role of both shaman and village chief, known as a tok batin. Dukun who inherited their knowledge from their parent or grandparent is held in higher esteem than one who served as another dukun's disciple. Typically the initiation ritual involves meditation at a mountain, waterfall, cemetery or some other location away from people.

== Range of roles ==
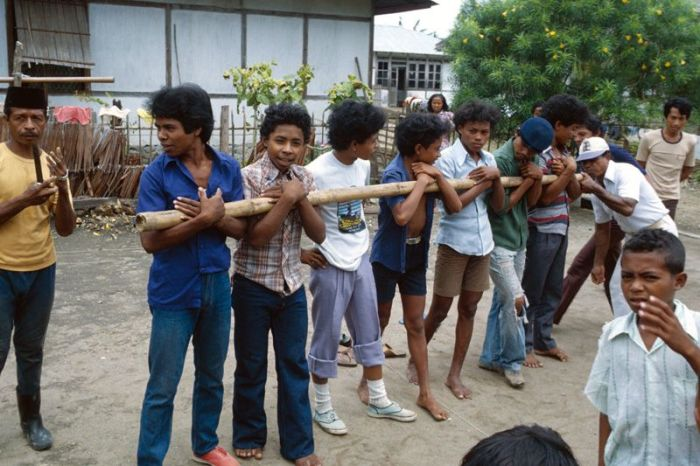
A dukun (left) during the Bambu Gila (Mad Bamboo) ceremony in Liang Village, Ambon, Maluku.

Dukun have a number of titles and ascribed abilities — the dukun roles below are sometimes taken up by dukuns with specific titles and roles, rather than any one dukun utilizing all of the roles below.

=== Medicinal and curative ===
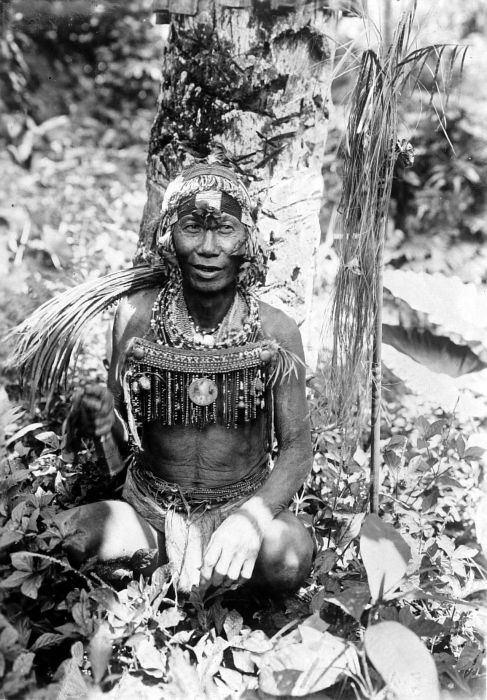
A medicinal dukun (sikerei) of Sakuddei people, Siberut, Mentawai Islands.

The dukun's primary role is that of a healer. They may use herbalism, incantations (jampi), chants (mantra), animal parts, inanimate objects, spiritual communication or guidance, prayers, offerings, the keris or any combination to effect their curatives.

=== Exorcism ===
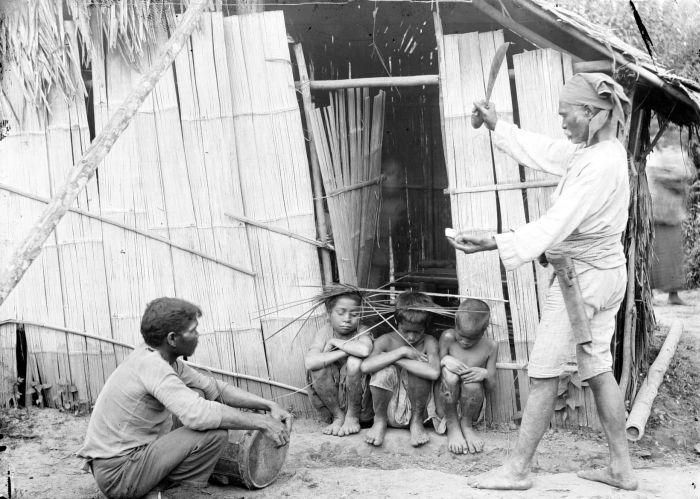
A shaman exorcising evil spirits occupying children, Buru Island (1920).

Dukun are believed to be able to communicate directly with malevolent and benevolent spirits. Spirits are said not to resist the dukun in their removal from their 'host', as they are enthralled that a living being can communicate with them.

=== Divination and soothsaying ===
Dukun are most famous for prophetic visions. This is often the result of consulting spirits relating to one's deceased family who often provide insight into what is likely to happen.

=== Charms and blessings ===
Dukun will occasionally bless an individual or a business, to keep away termites or spirits or demons, or over a piece of land to ensure a good harvest.

=== Spiritual communications ===
Dukun are alleged to see normally invisible spirits and communicate as easily as though the spirit were physically present. Many spirits are supposed to speak archaic Javanese or Sundanese and the Dukun may be able to speak these languages during momentary spiritual possessions, despite not having prior knowledge of these languages.

=== Sorcery ===
Dukun are generally benevolent shamans. On occasion, some practitioners may be employed to cast revenge hexes and incantations.

Some known incantations include:

Jengges: Offerings such as incense and opium are arranged in a half-circle, as are nails, glass and needles. The dukun then asks the spirits to embed the items in the victim's stomach.

Gendam: The dukun chants the victim's name so that the target cannot rest until they are cured by another dukun.

Naruga: The dukun implants an emotional suggestion in the victim. It may be benevolent such as a love spell, or malevolent- causing the target to murder someone else.

Santet: The dukun causes pain and even death to the target. from distant ranges without physical contact

Sirep: The dukun causes people to fall under a deep, unshakable slumber.

Tenung: This ritual involves creating a half circle of food offerings, including opium and incense, while chanting for the destruction of the victim. The target suffers headaches, vomiting and illness until remedied by another dukun.

Susuk: The dukun implants an enchanted metal needle into the patient's body. The dukun will use a spirit to implant the needle without leaving a wound. Originally a primitive form of skin-tightening, this procedure is supposed to make the patient more attractive. Mostly used by women, it could also be used for making a person less physically vulnerable

== Society, belief and violence ==
=== Fraud and assault ===
Many dukun have been jailed for fraud and sexual assault in Indonesia. Sometimes, dukun have been killed in revenge attacks or by people thinking bad luck was caused by a dukun.

=== 1998 East Java ninja scare ===
The 1998 East Java ninja scare was an outbreak of violence in East Java, Indonesia, in which the local population believed they were being targeted by sorcerers, and vigilantes killed people suspected of being sorcerers. People described the vigilantes as ninjas. As many as 150-300 “sorcerers” were killed between February and October, with the most deaths occurring between August and September.

== See also ==
- Aliran Kepercayaan
- Bomoh
- Babaylan
- Chinese ritual mastery traditions
- Kejawèn
- Malaysian folk religion
- Pawang
- Shamanism
- Tajul muluk
