= Folklore of Malaysia =

Local tales and legends from Malaysia

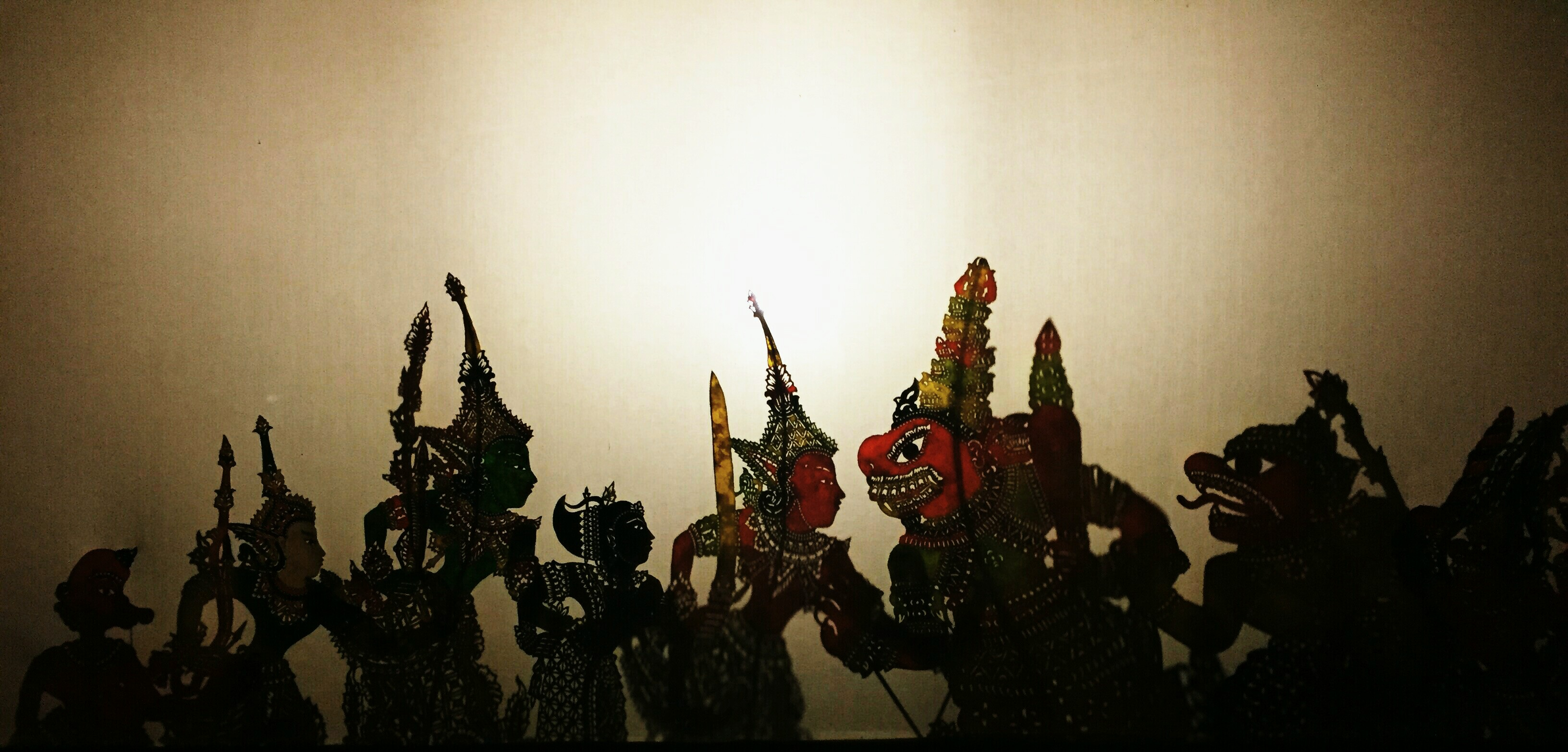
A Kelantanese Wayang Kulit that narrated the tale of Hikayat Seri Rama.

Malaysian folklore is the folk culture of Malaysia and other indigenous people of the Malay Archipelago as expressed in its oral traditions, written manuscripts and local wisdoms. Malaysian folklores were traditionally transmitted orally in the absence of writing systems. Oral tradition thrived among the Malays, but continues to survive among Orang Asli and numerous Bornean ethnic groups in Sarawak and Sabah. Nevertheless, Malaysian folklores are closely connected with classical Malay folklore of the region. Even though Malay folklore tends to have a regional background, the passing of time and the influence of the modern media have caused large parts of regional Malay folklore have become interwoven with the wider popular Malaysian folklore.

In Malay, the term budaya rakyat is used to describe folklore. According to the Kamus Dewan, budaya rakyat can be interpreted as stories, customs, clothing, behaviour etc. that are inherited by a society or a nation. Malaysian folklore takes a heavy influence from Indian tradition, with a number of figures, legends, and creatures being adapted from the pre-Islamic traditions of the Malay Archipelago. This Indian influence means that Malaysian folklore generally differs between regions in the country, folklores from west Malaysia have more influence of Indian folklores than east Malaysia. However, many parts of Malay and Malaysian folklore still contain evidence of pre-Islamic past.

== Folk tales ==
Malaysian folk tales include a vast variety of forms such as myths, legends, fables, etc. The main influences on Malaysian folk tales have been Indian, Javanese and middle eastern folk tales. Many Indian epics have been translated into Malay since ancient time including the Sanskrit epics of Ramayana and Mahabharata, which are the basis of the Malaysian art of Wayang Kulit. Besides Indian epics, the Javanese epic of Panji has also influenced Malay literature and plays a major part in enriching Malaysian folk tales.

Malaysian folk tales are usually centred around romance between princes and princesses, kings and queens, or heroes and their damsels. Until today, numerous royal courts exist in Malaysia and supplied the basis of many folk stories. For example, folk tales like Puteri Lindungan Bulan and Raja Bersiong have always been associated with the Sultanate of Kedah, and the story of Puteri Limau Purut has been associated with the Sultanate of Perak. Due to the nature of migration in the region, some of the popular Malaysian folk tales may also arrived from other part of Malay Archipelago.

=== Folk tales ===
These folk tales are often told by story tellers called penglipur lara, which defined by Kamus Dewan as people who comfort the sad heart by telling folk tales with elements of humour, usually interspersed with pantun, syair, seloka etc. There are a few penglipur lara that exist today, often farmers or villagers in rural Malaysia. Different form of story tellers exists throughout Malaysia – Awang Batil or Awang Belanga in Perlis; Mak Yong, Siamese Menora, Tok Selampit, Wayang Kulit Kelantan in Kelantan; Hamdolok and Javanese Wayang Kulit Purwo in Johor; Minangkabau Randai and Tukang Kaba in Negeri Sembilan, Jikey, Mek Mulung and Wayang Kulit Gedek in Kedah; Bangsawan in Melaka and Penang.

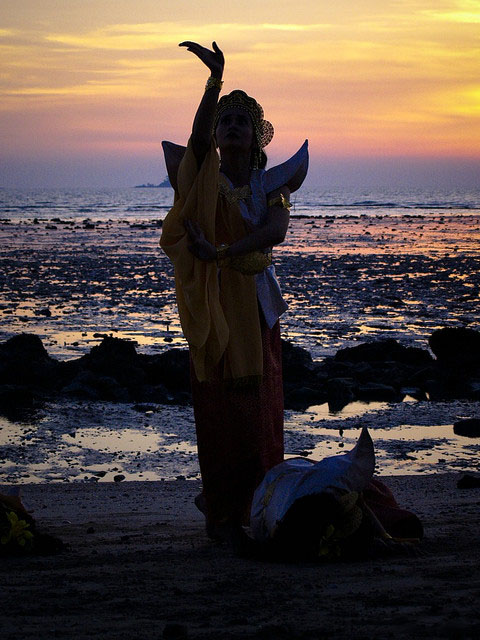
A Terengganuan Ulek Mayang folk dance.

Among the popular Malaysian folk tales are as follows:

- Anak Buluh Betung
- Badang
- Batu Belah Batu Bertangkup
- Bawang Merah Bawang Putih
- Bidasari
- Buaya Sangkut & Upeh Guling from Johor
- Bujang Senang from Sarawak
- Bukit Melawati from Selangor
- Bukit Puteri from Terengganu
- Cik Siti Wan Kembang from Kelantan
- Dang Isah Tandang Sari from Sarawak
- Dayang Senandung
- Gua Cerita from Kedah
- Gua Kota Gelanggi from Pahang
- Huminodun from Sabah
- Laksamana Bentan from Johor
- Lata Kijang from Negeri Sembilan
- Mahsuri from Kedah
- Mat Chinchang Mat Raya from Kedah
- Monsopiad from Sabah
- Naga Gunung Kinabalu from Sabah
- Naga Tasik Chini from Pahang
- Nahkoda Ragam from Penang
- Puteri Buih
- Puteri Gunung Ledang from Johor
- Puteri Limau Purut from Perak
- Puteri Lindungan Bulan from Kedah
- Puteri Saadong from Kelantan
- Puteri Santubong Puteri Sejenjang from Sarawak
- Raja Bersiong from Kedah
- Si Tanggang
- Singapura Dilanggar Todak
- Sri Rambai from Penang
- Tasik Dayang Bunting from Kedah
- Telaga Tujuh from Kedah
- Tugau from Sarawak
- Ulek Mayang from Terengganu
- Upu Chendera Burung from Selangor
- Walinong Sari from Pahang

Besides popular Malaysian folk tales mentioned above, the exclusive stories of Mak Yong are considered as the most authentic form of Malay folk tales. Some of those obtained from outside the Malay-Thai region have now died out elsewhere such as Anak Raja Gondang, a story originally from the Jataka tales but now almost unknown in India.

Twelve Mak Yong stories that are considered complete, original and of sufficient artistic value are:

- Dewa Muda
- Dewa Pencil
- Dewa Sakti
- Dewa Indera, Indera Dewa
- Dewa Panah
- Endeng Tejali
  - Anak Raja Gondang
  - Batak Raja Gondang
  - Bongsu Sakti
- Gading Bertimang
- Raja Tangkai Hati
- Raja Muda Lakleng
- Raja Muda Lembek
- Raja Besar Dalam Negeri Ho Gading
- Bentara Muda

=== Folk comics ===
Malay folk comics are also part of Malaysian folk tales and usually spread orally, even after it is written it still retains its oral properties.

Among the popular Malay folk comics are as follows:

- Abu Nawas
- Lebai Malang
- Mahasyodhak
- Mat Jenin
- Musang Berjanggut
- Pak Belalang
- Pak Kadok
- Pak Pandir
- Si Luncai

=== Animal folk tales ===
The two kancils supporting the shield of Malaccan coat of arms, serve to recall the legend involving a kancil had attacked one of the hunting dogs of Parameswara, the first king of Malacca, and kicked the dog into the river.

Malaysian animal folk tales are often used to explain certain natural phenomena or moral lessons. The animals in these stories usually possess the ability to speak and think like humans. In Malaysian animal folk tales, the Kancil usually portray as the main character with other animals in the forest as supporting characters. In Malay culture, Kancil is regarded with the highest esteem due to its ability to overcome obstacles and defeat adversaries despite its rather small appearance. Kancil also appears in the state herald of Melaka and even plays a part in the legend of the founding of Melaka.

Among the Malaysian Kancil stories manuscripts are as follows:

- Hikayat Sang Kancil
- Pelanduk dengan Anak Memerang
- Hikayat Pelanduk Jenaka

Among the popular Kancil stories are as follows:

- Sang Kancil Berkawan dengan Monyet
- Sang Kancil dengan Buaya
- Sang Kancil dengan Gajah
- Sang Kancil dengan Gergasi
- Sang Kancil dengan Harimau Tua
- Sang Kancil dengan Landak
- Sang Kancil dengan Monyet
- Sang Kancil dengan Perigi Buta
- Sang Kancil dengan Tali Pinggang Hikmat
- Sang Kancil digigit Buaya
- Sang Kancil Menipu Harimau
- Sang Kancil Menolong Kerbau

== Folk music ==
=== Folk music ===
Every states in Malaysia employ different versions of oral traditions but the most popular is in the form of folk-singing or lagu rakyat. For example, Ghazal Melayu can be heard in all over Malaysia but it is most associated with Johor district of Muar. In Ghazal Melayu, poets and singers vocalize pantun or syair to the middle eastern and Indian-inspired music called Ghazal Melayu. This form of folk-singing is also performs at weddings and cultural festivals. In Melaka, Dondang Sayang, a Malaccan love ballad, is perform by Malays and the Malay-speaking Peranakan communities, with pantun usually themed around love, life, and marriage. This variety of genres in Malaysian folk music reflects the cultural groups within Malaysian society; Malay, Chinese, Indian, Dayak, Kadazandusun, Bajau, Orang Asli, Melanau, Kristang, Siamese and others.

Different form of folk music can be heard throughout Malaysia – Negeri Sembilan with its Minangkabau Bongai and Tumbuk Kalang; Kelantan with its Dikir Barat and Rebana Ubi; Sabah with their Kulintangan and Bajau Isun-Isun and Kadazandusun Murut Sompoton; Sarawak with their Bermukun, Iban Engkromong and Orang Ulu Sape; Perak with its Belotah and Rebana Perak; Penang with its unique Boria and Ghazal Parti; Selangor with its Javanese Cempuling and Keroncong; Terengganu with its middle eastern inspired Rodat and Kertuk Ulu.

Within each of these folk-singing forms, messages and stories are told, handing down of local wisdom from one generation to another in the form of poetry which may include any of these:

- Pantun – Malay poem that usually consists of four lines in each stanza. The first two lines are hints and the rest contains meaning.
- Syair – Malay poem that usually consists of four lines with the same sound at the end of each stanza.
- Gurindam – pantun that consists of two lines that contain advice or teaching.
- Seloka – Malay poem that contains teachings, satire, or humour.
- Nazam – Malay poem (similar to syair) consisting of twelve lines in each stanza.
- Sajak – Modern Malay poem (different from pantun or syair) composed in beautiful language to express thoughts, feelings, or experiences.
- Mantera - Malay poem that when read can cause supernatural powers (to cure diseases etc.)
- Teromba - Malay poem that contains teachings of Malay customs and traditions in Negeri Sembilan.

Malaysian folk music has also provide inspiration for Malaysian cultural practitioner for centuries. Folk musics, which were originally accompanied by pantun, syair or gurindam, provided inspiration for dance and other styles of performing arts.

Names of traditional Malay songs are the following:

- Anak Raja Turun Beradu
- Anak Ikan
- Anak Manja
- Anak Tiong
- Bayangan Pelangi
- Bukit Melati
- Bulan Purnama
- Bunga Raya
- Bunga Tanjong
- Burung Punggok
- Burung Puteh
- Cenderawasih
- Damak
- Damak Bentan
- Embon Berderai
- Embon Menitik
- Gambus Api-api
- Gunong Banang
- Gunong Bentan
- Gunong Daik
- Gunong Lambak
- Gunong Panti
- Hari Dunia
- Istana Melati
- Jalak Lenteng
- Kasih Menumpang
- Kuala Deli
- Laila Majnon
- Laila Manja
- Laksamana Mati Di-Bunoh
- Lanchang Daik
- Luka Di Hati
- Makan Sireh
- Malam Merindu
- Mas Merah
- Mega Mendong
- Mendong Petang
- Mustika Embon
- Nasib Badan
- Pak Ngah Balik
- Puteri Ledang
- Sambas
- Sayang Musalmah
- Seri Banang
- Seri Mersing
- Seri Muar
- Seri Serawak
- Seri Siantan
- Siti Payong
- Tambak Johor
- Timang Banjar
- Tudong Saji

The existence of pre-Islamic beliefs can be traced in traditional Malay songs due to the number of "Kualas", "Hulus", "Gunungs" and "Seris" mentioned in the lyrics and titles. Geographically, many names in the classical pantun and names of the songs are mainly "southern" Malaysia. Some of these melodies were later adopted into other popular folk music genres such as asli, inang or joget.

=== Folk songs ===
Malaysian folklore includes a considerable collection of folksongs. However, several of these folksongs might have been originated from other parts of the Malay Archipelago. Many of these songs are in the form of stories weaved into poetry or simple rhyme. These folksongs are often integrated with moral values and some may also include stories of talking animals such as Bangau Oh Bangau and Tanya Sama Pokok.

Among the popular Malaysian children folksongs are as follows:

- 1 2 3 Sayang Semuanya
- Air Pasang Pagi
- Anak Ayam
- Anak Itik Tok Wi
- Anak Rusa Nani
- Anaklah Ikan
- Bangun Pagi
- Bangau Oh Bangau
- Bapaku Pulang Dari Kota
- Buai Laju-laju
- Bunga Matahari
- Burung Kakak Tua
- Burung Kenek-kenek
- Chan Mali Chan
- Che Mamat Parang Tajam
- Dayung Sampan
- Dodoi Si Dodoi
- Embun Sok Sek
- Enjit-enjit Semut
- Geylang Sipaku Geylang
- Hujan Dah Turun
- Ikan Kekek
- Jong-jong Inai
- Kopi Susu
- Lagu Tiga Kupang
- Lenggang Kangkung
- Lompat Si Katak Lompat
- Nenek Si Bongkok Tiga
- Oh Anakku
- Oh Bulan
- Patendu Patende
- Rasa Sayang
- Saya Ada Kuda
- Sepuluh Budak Hitam
- Suar Suir Kemuning
- Sungai
- Suriram
- Tanya Sama Pokok
- Tebang Tebu
- Tepuk Amai-amai
- Tidurlah Adik
- Trek Tek Tek
- Waktu Fajar
- Wau Bulan
- Wau-wau Pepeh

Among the popular Malaysian regional folksongs are as follows:

- Bajau and Suluk
  - Bolak-bolak
  - Daling-daling
  - Kuda Pasu
  - Limbai
  - Mengiluk
  - Tarirai
- Brunei and Cocos Malays
  - Adai-adai
  - Dansa
  - Umang-umang Ting-ting
- Kadazandusun and Murut
  - Angalang
  - Liliput
  - Magunatip
  - Mongigol Sumayau
  - Mongigol Sumundai
  - Sumazau Papar
  - Sumazau Penampang
  - Titikas
- Kenyah
  - Ateklan
  - Lan E
  - Lane Tuyang
  - Leleng
  - Nombor Satu Nombor Dua
  - Pui Ngeleput Burui
  - Suket
  - Telu Tiang
- Kristang
  - Ala Banda Isti Banda
  - Che Corte
  - Farraperra
  - Jingli Nona
  - Kanji Papa
  - Nina Boboi
  - O Bela
  - Riba de Barku
  - Sarampeh

== Folk epics ==
=== Epic hikayat ===
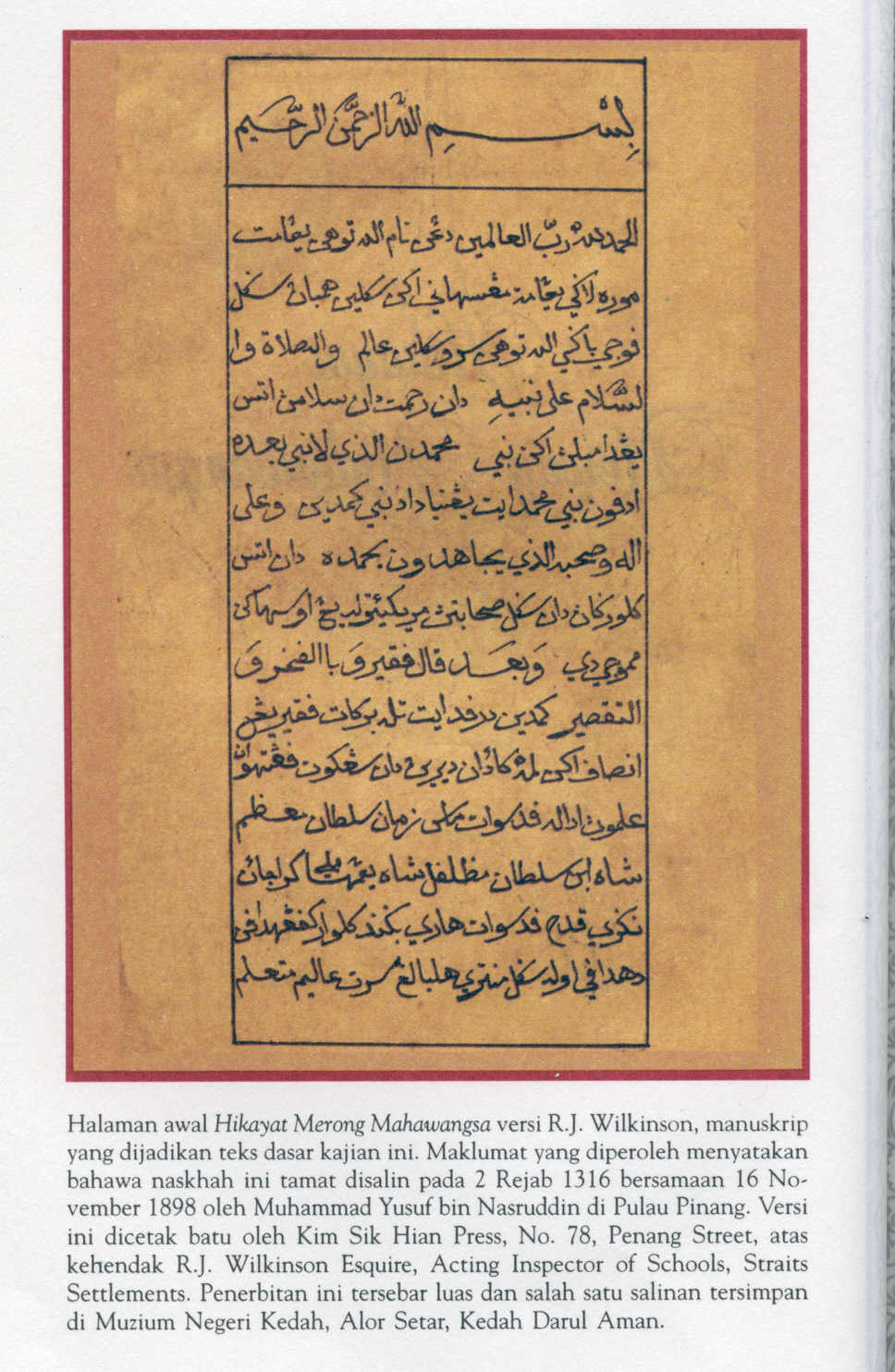
Hikayat Merong Mahawangsa in Jawi script.

Hikayat is a form of Malay literature, which tell the romanticised adventures of Malay heroes, or royal chronicles. The stories though based on historical events, are often involving mythological figures in a setting usually engaging the role of protagonists and antagonists. Often in Malay epics, the child would be born with a weapon or a magical creatures. Many of these hikayat were written in classical Malay using Jawi script from around the 15th century onward. Among the popular Malay folk hikayat are as follows:

- Hikayat Ahmad dan Muhammad
- Hikayat Amir Hamzah
- Hikayat Anggun Cik Tunggal
- Hikayat Awang Sulung Merah Muda
- Hikayat Bayan Budiman
- Hikayat Hang Tuah
- Hikayat Indera Quraisyin
- Hikayat Inderaputera
- Hikayat Isma Dewa
- Hikayat Malim Deman
- Hikayat Malim Dewa
- Hikayat Marakarma
- Hikayat Merong Mahawangsa
- Hikayat Raja Ambong
- Hikayat Raja Budiman
- Hikayat Raja Dewa Maharupa
- Hikayat Raja Donan
- Hikayat Raja Muda
- Hikayat Silindung Dalima
- Hikayat Terung Pipit
- Hikayat Ular Nangkawang

Some of these epic stories were also believed to be an actual historical events that took place in the Malay Archipelago. For example,

- Anggun Cik Tunggal is set in Tiku-Pariaman
- Malim Deman – set in Muar
- Hang Tuah – set in Melaka
- Benua Tua – a village located in Perak
- Lindungan Bulan – an alternative name for Kedah
- Nyiur Gading – an alternative name for Melaka
- Serendah Sekebun Bunga – an alternative name for Kelantan

Among the popular supporting characters in Malay epics are as follows:

- Nenek Kebayan
- Si Kembang Cina
- Bujang Selamat

=== Epic syair ===
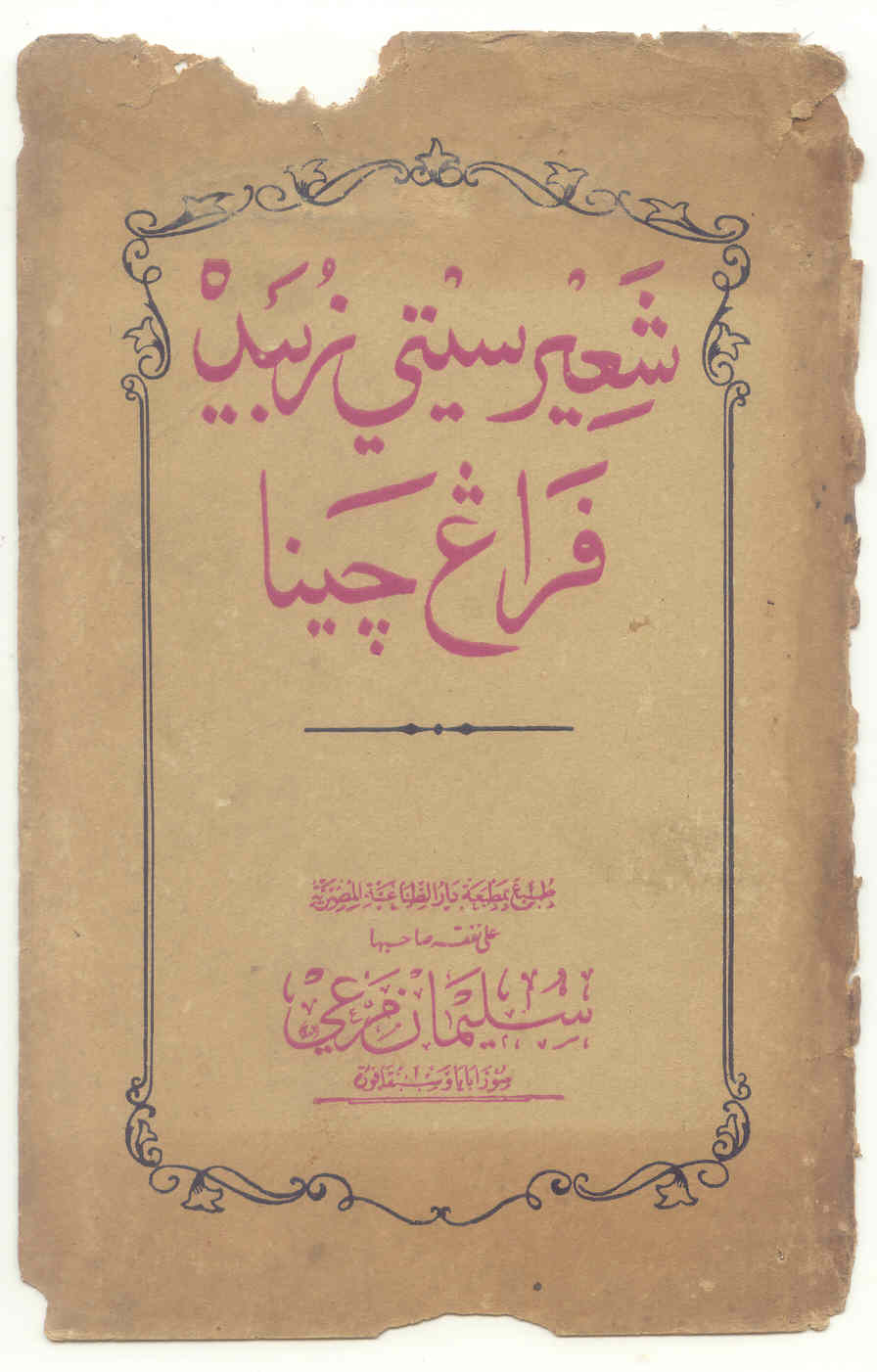
Syair Siti Zubaidah in Jawi script.

Syair is a form of Malay literature, that is made up of long narrative poems composed of four-line stanzas with the same end rhyme. The syair can be a narrative poem, a didactic poem, a poem used to convey ideas on religion or philosophy, or even one to describe a historical event. Many of these syair were written in Jawi classical Malay.

Among the popular Malay folk syair that in form of hikayat are as follows:

- Malay syair based on Panji stories:
  - Syair Angreni
  - Syair Jaran Temasa
  - Syair Ken Tambuhan
  - Syair Panji Semerang
  - Syair Undakan Agung Udaya
- Malay syair based on romantic stories:
  - Syair Batu Belah Batu Bertangkup
  - Syair Bidasari
  - Syair Damar Wulan
  - Syair Dandan Setia
  - Syair Dang Sirat
  - Syair Kumbang Mengindera
  - Syair Puteri Bunga Kamar
  - Syair Puteri Handalan
  - Syair Ratu Juwita
  - Syair Si Lindung Delima
  - Syair Silambari (known as Shak-yer Sinyor Layla in Baba Malay)
  - Syair Siti Zubaidah
  - Syair Sultan Abdul Muluk
- Malay syair based on real events, places or characters:
  - Syair Bah Singapura
  - Syair Pelayaran Sultan Iskandar
  - Syair Perang Johor
  - Syair Perang Perak
  - Syair Perang Turki dan Rusia
  - Syair Singapura Terbakar
  - Syair Sultan Abu Bakar
  - Syair Sultan Mansur
  - Syair Sultan Maulana
- Malay syair based on Islamic stories:
  - Syair Abdassaman
  - Syair Adham
  - Syair Anbia
  - Syair Nabi Allah Adam
  - Syair Nabi Allah Ibrahim
  - Syair Nabi Allah Yusuf
  - Syair Nur Muhammad
- Malay syair that contains stories that are told in the form of allegory:
  - Syair Burung Pungguk
  - Syair Ikan Terubuh Berahikan Puyu-Puyu
  - Syair Kumbang dan Melati
  - Syair Kupu-kupu
  - Syair Nuri
  - Syair Nyamuk dan Lalat

=== Epic creatures ===
Malaysians have always taken great interest in stories of ghosts and mythical creatures. Due to the animistic root of Malaysian folk lores, these ghosts are seen as sharing the plane of existence with humans and are not always considered evil. However, when the delicate line that separates the boundaries of existence is crossed, or a transgression of living spaces occurs, a conflict ensues that may result in disturbances such as possessions. In Malay, the term hantu is used to describe demon, ghost or ghoul and similar to the Japanese Yōkai. Malay folk stories also adopted elements from the Islamic world, of middle eastern and Persian origin, which are somewhat differ from what Malays now refer to as angels or demons.

Among the popular ghost or mythical creatures in Malay folk lores are as follows:

- Ghosts
  - Bajang: a ghost with long nails that supposedly likes to disturb pregnant women or children
  - Pelesit: a ghost who supposedly likes to suck blood (usually represent themselves as grasshoppers)
  - Penanggalan: a ghost that supposedly can fly while its stomach is strapped out.
  - Pocong: a ghost in the form of corpses wrapped in shrouds
  - Puntianak or Langsuir: a ghost who supposedly likes to suck blood and disturb women in childbirth, and usually are themselves like women
  - Toyol: a ghost who supposedly like to steal money
- Humanoid beings
  - Bidadara: a prince in heaven or in Kayangan
  - Bidadari: a princess in heaven or in Kayangan
  - Bunian or Siluman: hidden people in the forest
  - Duyung: a woman who is supposedly half human and half fish (tail part) and lives in the sea
  - Kelambai: a female red-haired ogre
  - Orang Mawas: a Bigfoot of Johor
  - Orang Minyak: a being who lubricates his body with oil (so that he will not be easily caught) and usually harasses women with the intention of violating them
  - Raksasa or Gergasi or Bota: a man-eating giant
- Lycanthropic beings
  - Jadian: a human being who can transform themselves into animals (especially tigers)
- Mythical beings
  - Naga: a fictional creature in the form of crocodiles or snakes but with wings and claws, able to breathe fire out of its mouth
  - Semberani: a fictional creature in the form of a horse with wing and can fly
  - Sulur Bidar: a fictional creature in the form of man-eating carpet monster and lives in the lake
  - Tambuakar: a fictional creature in the form of a dragon that evolved from fish after thousand of years
- Mythical birds
  - Burung Bayan: a mythical bird that brings romantic notions
  - Burung Cenderawasih: a mythical bird in heaven or in Kayangan
  - Burung Geroda: a mythical bird in classical Malay literature, great eagle
  - Burung Jentayu: a mythical bird that always cries out for rain
  - Burung Petala: a mythical bird, guardian of Kelantan
- Middle eastern and Persian additions
  - Buraq: an animal (in the form of winged horses and heads like human) ridden by Muhammad during Israk
  - Dajal: a creature that is believed to exist when the end times is near
  - Jin: a creature created by Allah from fire that can resemble angels
  - Malaikat: a creature created by Allah from light, their nature and habits are always submissive and obedient to Allah and never violate His commands
  - Peri: a genie who can be transformed into a beautiful woman
  - Syaitan: an evil subtle being who encourages evil

== Folk medicine ==
=== Folk medicine ===
Malaysia is home to one of the world's oldest rainforests, rich in biodiversity with a great variety of plant species. With this biodiversity, a traditional medicine called ramuan is made from natural materials, such as roots, bark, flowers, seeds, leaves and fruits found in the forest, creating pleasing or healthful effects in the preparation of food and herbal medicines. In a broader context, the term ramuan is interchangeable with the concept of “mixture”. However, it further encompasses the sense of ingredient harmonizations; unity and integration of local ingredients.

Kitab Tib is a medical manuscripts written in classical Malay is the basis of written Malay folk medicine. It refers to all medical manuscripts that usually discusses how to treat various diseases using materials from trees and plants mixed with spice ingredients, including constipation, menstruation and rheumatism. The use of prayer is also sometimes included in these manuscripts.

=== Folk healing ===
Besides, written manuscript, Main Puteri, a traditional methods of healing in Kelantan has existed since long ago among the Malay community in the state. It is difficult to distinguish between the aspects of "performing arts" and "medical ritual" in Main Puteri because there is a close relationship between these two elements. From the point of view of performance there are interesting elements in this art, combines the elements of acting, singing, dance and music; in addition to a combination of Islamic, magical and ritual elements. Tok Teri, the group leader, also acts as an intermediary to connect the patient with the Angin or Semangat. During this ritual, Tok Teri will be changing character; being cruel and fierce, senile old, disabled youth, nasal-voiced and various other characters to describe the pain borne by the patient.

Different form of folk-healing ritual can be performed throughout Malaysia – Sabah with its Bajau Berasik and Murut Magunatip; Sarawak with its Melanau Dakan and Iban Sugi Sakit; Terengganu with its Saba.

== See also ==
- Malaysian culture
- Malaysian folk religion
- Malay folklore
