= Malay folklore =

Culture

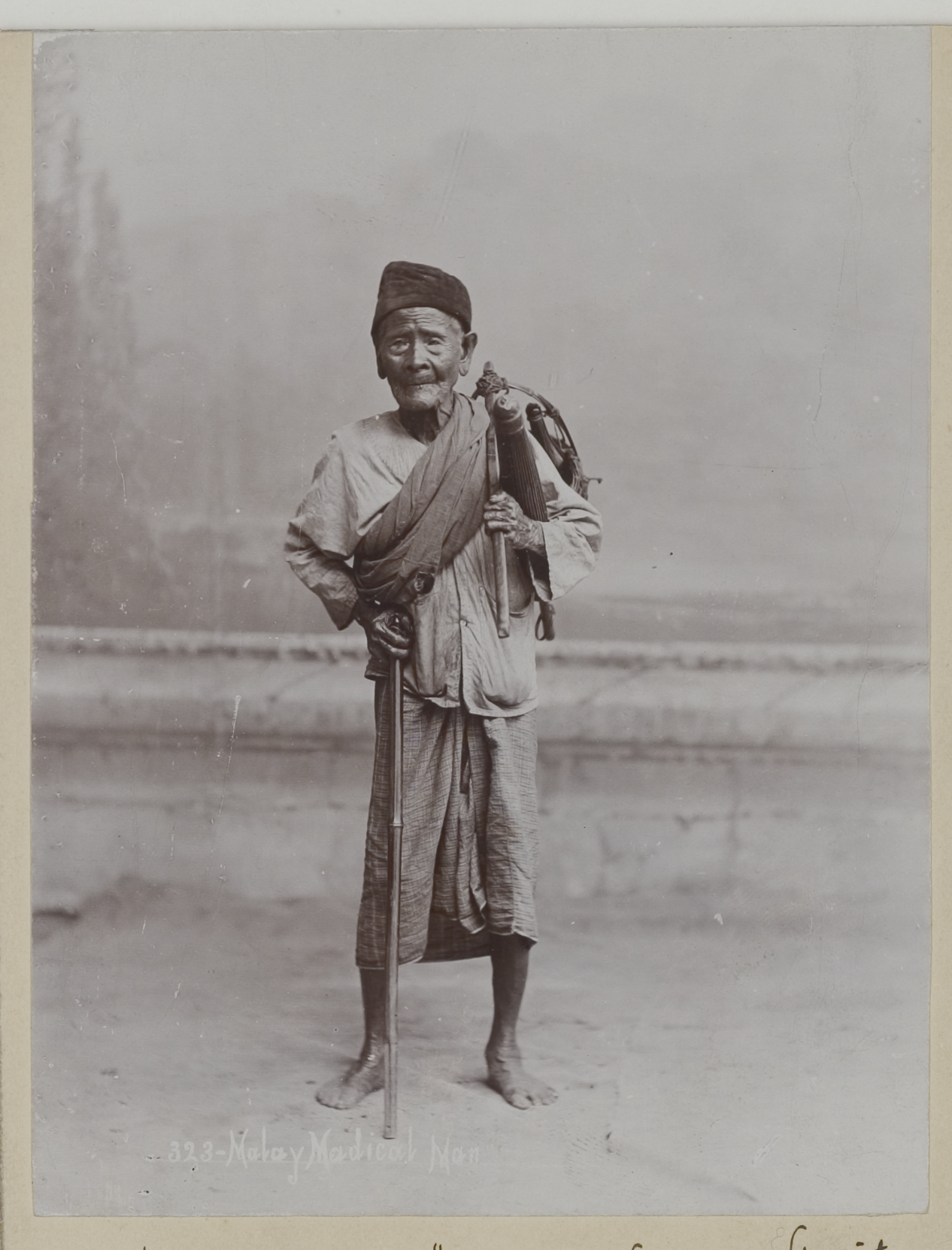
A traditional Malay healer in Singapore, the Straits Settlements – circa 1890.

Malay folklore refers to a series of knowledges, traditions and taboos that have been passed down through many generations in oral, written and symbolic forms among the indigenous populations of Maritime Southeast Asia (Nusantara). They include among others, themes and subject matter related to the indigenous knowledge of the ethnic Malays and related ethnic groups within the region.

The stories within this system of lore often incorporate supernatural entities and magical creatures which form parts of the Malay mythology. Others relate to creation myths and place naming legends that are often inter-twined with historical figures and events. Ancient rituals for healing and traditional medicine as well as complex philosophies regarding health and disease can also be found.

== Oral tradition ==
The oral forms of this lore are transmitted primarily through nursery rhymes, folksongs, theatrical exhibitions, and stories that are commonly told from parent to child. Nomadic storytellers that would roam the temples, marketplaces and palace courts also play a large part in the insemination of the oral traditions throughout the populace, often accompanied by music as well through forms of composed poetry and prose. The oral traditions are often integrated with moral values and some may also include stories of talking animals.

=== Folk music (lagu rakyat) ===
Of all the types of oral transmission, those in the form of music appear to be most prevalent in Malay society. Songs and melodies from times of old are sung and resung on a regular basis during festivities such as weddings, celebrations of motherhood and childbirth, rites of passage, and at cultural or religious celebrations. They are also utilized in the occasional ceremonial functions in royal weddings, in rites of ascension (or coronation) and royal birthday celebrations; in the form of the more refined court music.

Every region or each of the states may employ different versions of oral transmission but the most popular is in the form of folk-singing or lagu rakyat. The Middle Eastern-influenced ghazal can be heard in the southern Malaysian state of Johor especially in the district of Muar. Poets and singers consisting of often females and sometimes males vocalize popular love poems and riddles in the form of pantun to the accompaniment of composition and of music made for a six-stringed Arabian lute (see oud), Indian tablas, Western violins, accordion and marracas.

Forms of nursery rhymes and lullabies are also sung at weddings and cultural festivals in the state of Melaka by Malays and the Malay-speaking Peranakan communities. The contents of the songs are mostly to do with advice on love, life, and marriage and are affectionately known in Malay as dondang sayang meaning "song of love".

Within each of these folk-songs, messages and stories are told, a kind of informal handing down of wisdom from the old to the young in the form of poetry which may include any of these:

- Pantun – a poem with four stanzas, two of each rhyme with each other
- Syair – a poem also with four stanzas, with all ends rhyming together
- Seloka – a poem, similar to pantun
- Madah – a kind of rhyming speech, a discourse through poetry
- Gurindam – poetry, set to music

=== Folksongs ===
The Malay oral tradition includes a large collection of folksongs. Many of these songs are in the form of stories weaved into poetry or simple rhyme. These folksongs continue to be sung and a sizable number of them are included in the albums of modern-day singers, often with improvisations in terms of melody and more complex musical arrangements to suit a larger accompaniment of musicians as well as singers.

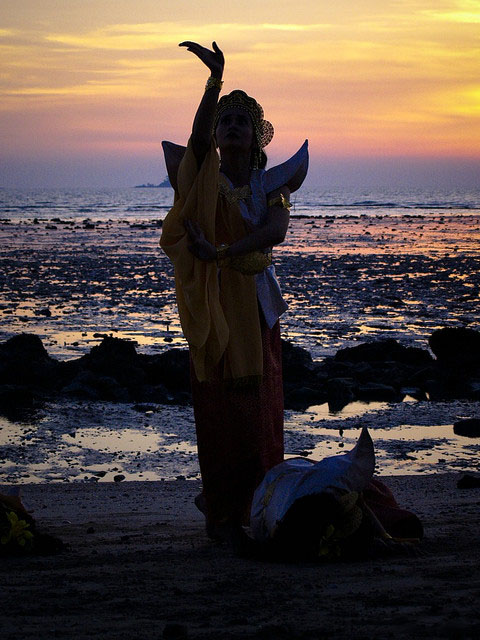
A dancer performing the Ulek Mayang. Manifested in a dance and healing ceremony, it narrates a mystical tale about the sea spirits in forbidden love with a fisherman.

Among the more well known Malay folksongs include:

- Air Pasang Pagi
- Anak Ayam
- Anak Itek Tok Wi
- Bangau Oh Bangau
- Bunga Hutan
- Burung Kakak Tua
- Chan Mali Chan
- Damak
- Dayung Sampan
- Di Tanjong Katong
- Geylang Sipaku Geylang
- Ikan Kekek
- Istana Bunian
- Itek Gembo-gembo
- Jong Inai
- Kenek-kenek Udang
- Ketipang Payong
- Kopi Susu
- Lanchang Kuneng
- Lenggang Kangkung
- Lompat Si Katak Lompat
- Londeh Mak Londeh
- Nak Dara Rindu
- Nenek Si Bongkok Tiga
- Rasa Sayang
- Suriram
- Sri Mersing
- Tanjong Puteri
- Tempuk Amai Amai
- Trek Tek Tek
- Tudong Periok
- Tumbok Kalang
- Ulek mayang
- Wau Bulan

A number of these folksongs originally belong to a certain region within Southeast Asia and are sung by the populations within the area. However, due to the nature of inter-mingling and mutual co-migrations within these areas, the folksongs may also be heard in places far from their original geographic origins.

=== Bardic tales (cerita penglipur lara) ===
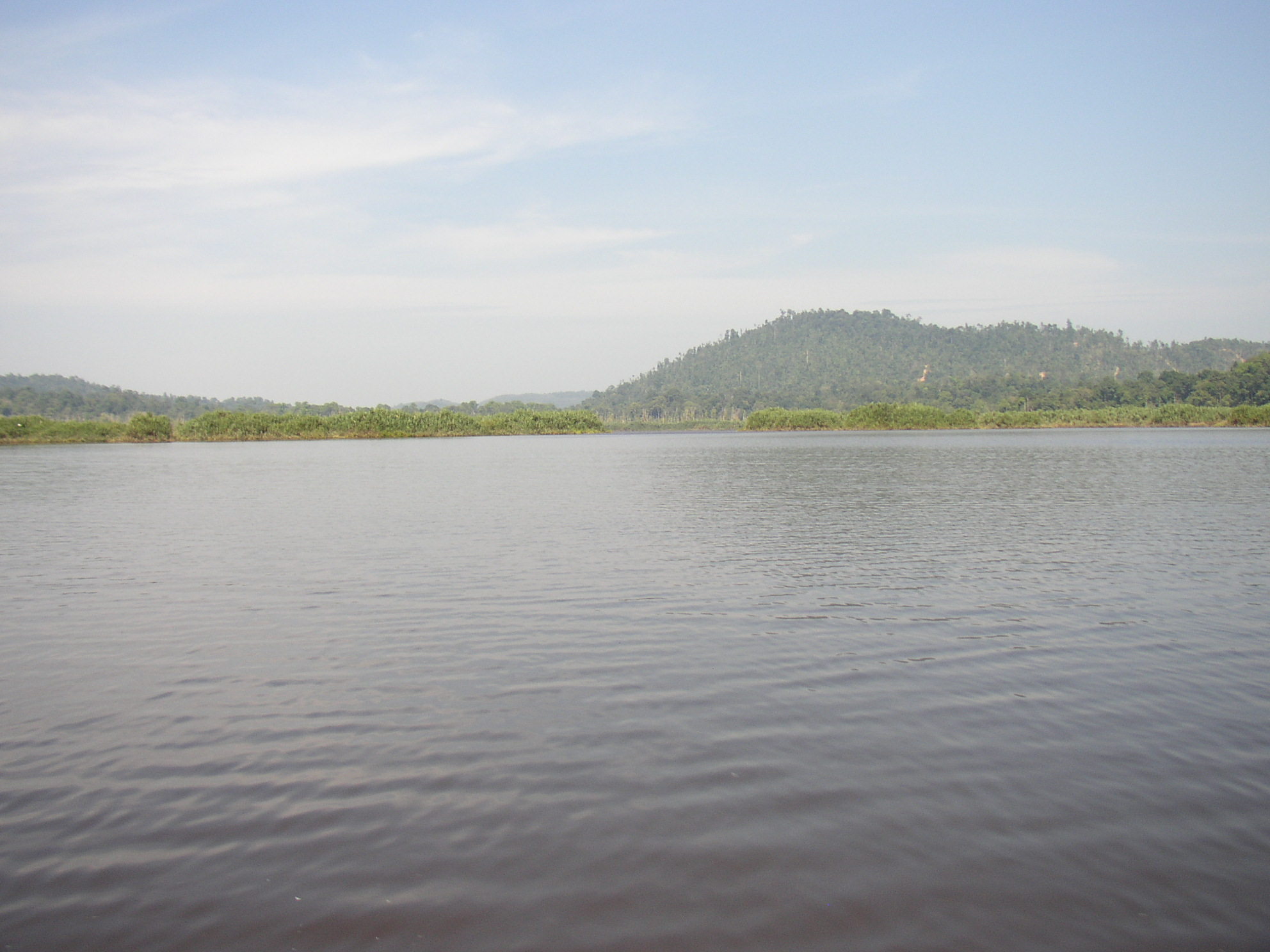
A view of Tasik Chini in Pahang, where a dragon known as Naga Seri Gumum is believed to dwell.

Stories of love and romance of princes and princesses, kings and queens, and heroes and their damsels in distress (and often, damsels and their heroes in distress) have long filled the imaginations of ethnic Malays. The fact that numerous royal courts existed and still exist in Southeast Asia supplied the basis of the stories. Although many of these tales are replete with additions (or reductions) and may contain a certain measure of exaggeration as well as the expected variations that existed from one story teller to another, the value and the wisdom behind each story cannot be ignored.

These stories are often told by professional story tellers called penglipur lara, which roughly translates to reliever of sorrows. The few penglipur lara that exist today are often farmers or at least rural villagers. In the past, travelling penglipur lara would carry the stories from one kampung (village) to another, making the occasional stops at marketplaces, village squares as well as royal courts. The essence of the stories remain the same but sometimes, adjustments are made according to the individual story-teller's preference. For example, the penglipur lara version of the Ramayana changes many of the names and settings and casts Laksmana as a pawang or Malay shaman, as opposed to the literary Hikayat Seri Rama or the theatrical Hikayat Maharaja Wana which remained closer to the original Indian epic.

Among the well known stories that may fall into this category includes the following:

- Anak Buloh Betong
- Batu Belah Batu Bertangkop
- Bayagong
- Lebai Malang
- Mat Jenin
- Naga Tasik Chini
- Nenek Kebayan
- Nujum Pak Belalang
- Pak Kaduk
- Pak Pandir
- Puteri Santubong Puteri Sejinjang
- Puteri Walinong Sari
- Raja Bersiong
- Sang Kelembai
- Si Bongkok
- Si Luncai
- Si Tanggang
- Singapura Dilanggar Todak

Many of these stories are also condensed and made into poetic songs. A fixed melody is set for each story to the extent that if a melody is played or sung in the absence of its wordings, a Malay would be able to instantly recall the title of the story or at least the name of the characters in the story.

=== Animal fables (cerita binatang) ===
Animal fables are often used to explain certain natural phenomena. Other times, they are simple moral tales. In almost all instances, the animals in these stories possess the ability to speak, reason and think like humans, similar to Aesop's Fables.

The kancil or mouse-deer serves as the main character in a number of the stories. The Malays regard this humble animal in the highest esteem due to its ability to overcome obstacles and defeat adversaries despite its rather small and benign appearance. The mouse-deer appears in the state herald of Melaka and even plays a part in the legend of Malacca's founding.

Below are listed some of the common fables as well as their approximate title translations. (Note that the word sang, an Old Malay honorific meaning "revered", appears in all instances preceding the name kancil to indicate respect)

- Kisah Sang Kancil dengan Buaya – The tale of the mouse-deer and the crocodile
- Kisah Sang Kancil dengan Monyet – The tale of the mouse-deer and the monkey
- Kisah Sang Kancil dengan Harimau – The tale of the mouse-deer and the tiger
- Kisah Sang Kancil dengan Gajah – The tale of the mouse-deer and the elephant
- Kisah Sang Kancil dengan Sang Sempoh – The tale of the mouse-deer and the bison
- Kisah Anjing dengan Bayang-bayang – The dog and the shadow
- Kisah Burung Gagak dan Merak – The crow and the peacock
- Kisah Burung Gagak yang Haus – The thirsty crow
- Kisah Labah-labah Emas – The golden spider
- Kisah Labah-labah dengan Burung Merpati – The spider and the pigeon
- Kisah Kerengga dengan Pemburu – The fire-ant and the hunter
- Kisah Burung Murai – The mockingbird
- Kisah Burung Kakak Tua – The cockatoo

=== Ghost stories (cerita hantu) ===
Malays, as with other Southeast Asians, have always taken great interest in stories of ghosts and spirits. It must be stressed that due to the animistic root of Malay folklore, these ghosts are seen as sharing the plane of existence with humans and are not always considered evil. However, when the delicate line that separates the boundaries of existence is crossed, or a transgression of living spaces occurs, a conflict ensues that may result in disturbances such as possessions.

The Malay word for ghost is hantu. However, this word also covers all sorts of demons, goblins and undead creatures and are thought to have real physical bodies, instead of just apparitions or spectres. The most famous of these is the pontianak, the ghost of a female stillborn child which lures men in the form of a beautiful woman.

Below are listed other popular supernatural beings and ghosts as well as their descriptions.

- Bajang: the spirit of a stillborn child in the form of a civet cat (musang).
- Bota: a type of evil spirit, usually a giant
- Hantu belian: an evil tiger spirit that enters the body of a human and runs amok
- Hantu galah: a ghost with legs and arms as long and slender as bamboo poles.
- Hantu kopek: a female ghost with large chest who lures men who cheat on their wives
- Hantu kum-kum: the ghost of an old woman who sucks the blood of virgin girls to regain her youth.
- Hantu lilin: a wandering spirit that carries a torch or a lit candle at night
- Hantu Pemburu: the Spectral Huntsman whose head is always looking upwards with a shoot growing from his neck
- Hantu punjut: a ghost that takes children who wander into the forest late at night
- Hantu tinggi: lit. "tall ghost", a type of giant that will flee at the sight of a naked body
- Jembalang: a demon or evil spirit that usually brings disease
- Lang suir: the mother of a pontianak. Able to take the form of an owl with long talons, and attacks pregnant women out of jealousy
- Mambang: animistic spirits of various natural phenomena
- Orang minyak: a cursed man covered in oil, who rapes women at night
- Pelesit: a type of grasshopper that precedes the polong's arrival.
- Penanggal: a flying head with its disembodied stomach sac dangling below. Sucks the blood of infants.
- Penunggu: tutelary spirits of particular places such as caves, forests and mountains.
- Pocong: a ghost wrapped in white burial shroud
- Polong: a spirit resembling a thumb-sized woman.
- Puaka: nature spirit of a place which are typically said to reside in abandoned buildings
- Raksaksa: humanoid man-eating demons. Often able to change their appearance at will.
- Toyol: the spirit of a stillborn child, appears as a naked baby or toddler

== Written forms ==
Malay folklore that appear as written traditions are often called hikayat, kisah or dongeng. The oldest of them were written in Old Malay using the prevailing scripts of the time, such as Sanskrit, Pallava or Kawi. From around the 14th century onward, they were written in Classical Malay using Jawi script which prevailed ever since the arrival of Islam until the colonial era. During this time, the Malay royal courts became the centre for learning where scribes record the genealogy of kings and queens as well as historical events.

=== Epics (hikayat) ===
The hikayat or epics are collections of stories and legends of heroism that often involve mythological and historical figures in a setting usually engaging the role of protagonists and antagonists. The Hikayat Hang Tuah and the story of Hang Jebat are among the most well known hikayat which are often told and retold in various forms such children's books, films, theatre plays and musical productions. The choice of who were to be portrayed as the protagonists and who were to be portrayed as the antagonists usually lies with the alignment of the storyteller, although most commonly, bards tend to maintain a stance of neutrality and dispassion in their story telling. In the stories of Hang Tuah and Hang Jebat for example, the lawful Hang Tuah may be portrayed as the hero, while sometimes, the non-lawful Hang Jebat may assume that role.

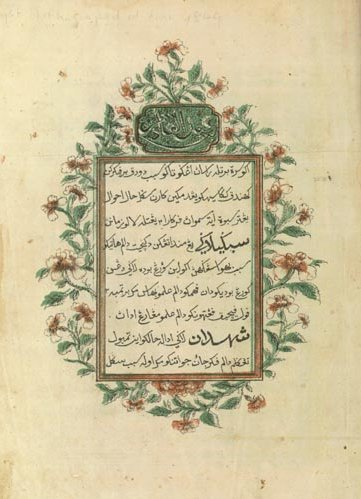
A page from the first edition of Hikayat Abdullah in the Jawi script. Published in 1849, it is a personal autobiography of Abdullah bin Abdul Kadir, a Malacca-born munshi of Singapore.

Other notable hikayat include:

- Hikayat Abdullah
- Hikayat Amir Hamzah or Hikayat Hamzah
- Hikayat Andaken Penurat
- Hikayat Anggun Che’ Tunggal
- Hikayat Bayan Budiman
- Hikayat Cekel Waneng Pati
- Hikayat Inderajaya
- Hikayat Inderaputera
- Hikayat Iskandar
- Hikayat Iskandar Zulkarnain
- Hikayat Isma Yatim
- Hikayat Malim Deman
- Hikayat Merong Mahawangsa
- Hikayat Muhammad Hanafiah
- Hikayat Panca Tanderan
- Hikayat Pandawa Lima
- Hikayat Patani
- Hikayat Raja-raja Pasai
- Hikayat Seri Rama or Hikayat Megat Seri Rama

=== Fairy tales (kisah dongeng) ===
Kisah dongeng are a loose collection of bedtime stories, fables and myths that involves human or non-human characters, often with superhuman powers along with talking animals, and an unearthly setting.

In this category, the story of Puteri Gunung Ledang, Bawang Putih Bawang Merah and Batu Belah Batu Bertangkup is well known by the Malays. All three have been made into movies, albeit with differing interpretations and settings.

==== Humanoid beings ====
Characters with human-likeness abound in these stories. They are collectively referred to as orang halus meaning the "refined folk" or "soft folk" (often erroneously translated as "elves"). Most are invisible to the average human.

- Orang Bunian: "hidden people" or "whistling people"; a race of exceptional beauty and grace.
- Orang ketot: humans with short stature, similar to dwarves
- Orang kenit: small humans, often possessing magic powers
- Gergasi: giants or ogres
- Gedembai or Kelembai: an ogre who has the power to turn things to stone.
- Duyong: mermaids, having the lower body of a fish and a woman's upper body
- Bidadari: beautiful heavenly nymphs

==== Therianthropic beings ====
- Harimau jadian or harimau akuan: were-tiger, were-leopard or were-panther
- Ular tedung jadian: were-cobra
- Lembu jadian: were-bull

==== Mythical birds ====
- Garuda: a bird made of fire
- Jentayu: a bird made of water
- Cenderawasih: also known as the Bird of Paradise, considered to be king of the birds; Guardian of a sacred jewel in Kahyangan, lit. the Abode of the Gods.
- Burung Petala: a bird in Kelantan-Pattani mythology

==== Beasts ====
- Naga: a dragon said to inhabit caves and watery areas
- Raja udang lit. King of Prawns: a very large prawn or lobster-like creature
- Gajah mina: a monstrous hybrid elephant headed fish that develops in Malay society, especially in Natuna and Pulau Tujuh.
- Hantu Belangkas: a gigantic king-crab that attacks people at sea.

==== Middle Eastern and Persian additions ====
Later folk stories adopted elements from the Islamic world, of Middle Eastern and Persian origin but having arrived by way of Muslims from India. They differ somewhat from their Arabian counterparts due to the fact that what Malays now refer to as angels or demons were originally animistic spirits and deities.

- Jin: Djinn
- Syaitan: Satan
- Pari-pari or peri: Fairies
- Malaikat: Angel (Religion-related)
- Bidadari/Bidadara: Woman/Man Angel
- Semberani: pegasus

== Symbolic lore ==
Apart from the stories and songs, Malay folklore also includes traditions, rituals and taboos related to the physical as well as the more metaphysical realms of the Malay world view. Such knowledge are usually presented in the forms of symbols and signs inscribed or built into temple walls, palaces, houses and often appear on stone inscriptions as well as grave markers. Natural symbolism are also important such as flowers, trees, animals, the sea as well as celestial objects such as the moon and stars. Malays also have knowledge of a series of constellations that are markedly different from the Indian system upon which it is based. Object symbolism such as wood carvings of animals, ancestral images, mythical beings and masks are also common in Malay society.

Symbolic forms of folklore are usually the domains of the spirits and are therefore sometimes employed by the traditional healers and shamans. The Malays have been known to employ supernatural forces for healing as well as in the aiding of child-birth, the curing of poisons and in the warding off of spirits. Due to the Islamization movement of recent decades, these practices are not very well-documented in Malay, but have been recorded in some Western sources.

== See also ==
- Folklore of Malaysia
- Hyang
- Mythology of Indonesia
- Philippine mythology
- Tajul muluk
