= Malim =

Malim may refer to

== Places ==
- Malim Jaya, a township in Batu Berendam, Malacca, Malaysia
- Tanjung Malim, a town in the state of Perak, Malaysia
- Malim Nawar, a small town in Perak, Malaysia
- Malim, a barangay of Tabina, Zamboanga del Sur, Philippines

== People ==
- William Malim (1533–1594), English academic and author, head master of Eton College
- Nigel Malim (1919–2006), Royal Navy officer

== Other ==
- Malim, an Empire ships coaster, formerly Empire Mayflower
- Hikayat Malim Dewa, a Malay literary work
