= Śukasaptati =

Historical Indian collection of stories

Śukasaptati (Tales of a Parrot)
- Author: Cintāmaṇi Bhaṭṭa(?)
- Language: Sanskrit
- Genre: Fables
- Publication date: 12th century CE
- Publication place: India

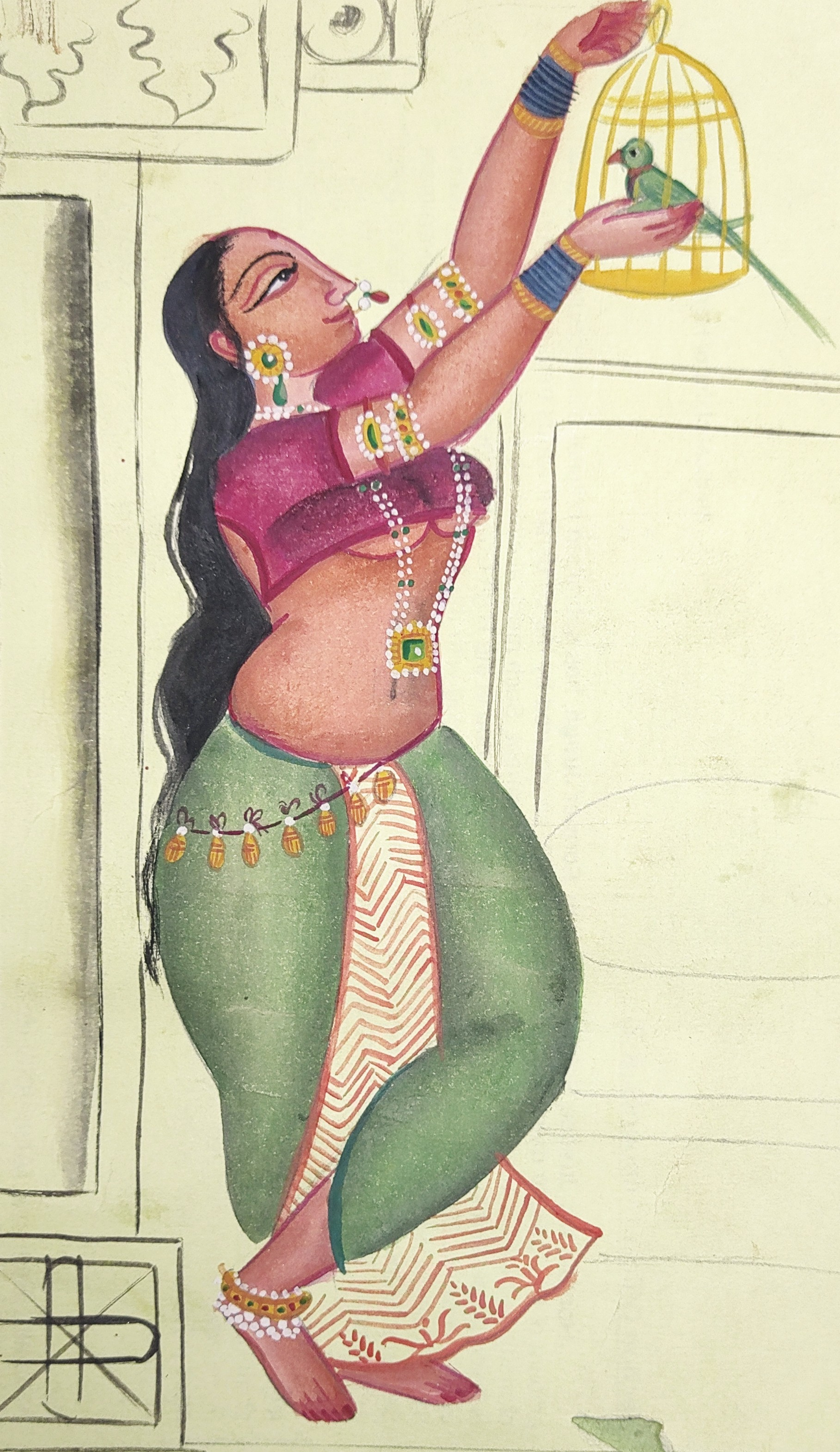
Prabhāvatī and the Parrot

Śukasaptati, or Seventy tales of the parrot, is a collection of stories originally written in Sanskrit. The stories are supposed to be narrated to a woman by her pet parrot, at the rate of one story every night, in order to dissuade her from going out to meet her paramour when her husband is away. The stories frequently deal with illicit liaisons, the problems that flow from them and the way to escape those crises by using one's wits. Though the actual purpose of the parrot is to prevent its mistress from leaving, it does so without moralising. At the end of the seventy days, the woman's husband returns from his trip abroad and all is forgiven. Most of the stories are ribald and uninhibited, with some verging on the pornographic. The situations depicted in the stories not only test the bounds of marriage, some stray into taboo areas of incest and, in one case, zoophilia.

The collection is part of the Katha tradition of Sanskrit literature. Some of the tales are actually repeated from earlier well-known collections in Sanskrit literature. In the tradition of Sanskrit literature, the tales are frequently interspersed with verse, many original, some repeated from earlier works. Though it is not known when it was originally written, current scholarship accepts that the collection was in its current form by the 12th century CE, though currently the oldest known manuscript dates back to the 15th century CE. The collection has been translated to many languages, including Persian in the 14th century, and in Malay, Hikayat Bayan Budiman, by a certain Kadi Hassan in 773 AH (1371 AD). It was last translated to English in 2000 CE.

== Structure ==
The collection, following the story within a story format to maintain continuity, actually contains 72 stories, of which one story acts as the main narrative. The remaining 71 stories are narrated by the parrot.

The main story is that of Madana Vinoda, the wayward son of a merchant, and his wife Prabhāvatī. The merchant's Brahmin friend tries to bring Madana to the path of righteousness by giving him a pet talking parrot. This attempt is successful as the parrot narrates a story that brings Madana to the path of duty. Having learnt his lesson, he sets off on a voyage, presumably on a business venture, leaving his wife alone.

Prabhāvatī, though initially dejected by her husband's departure, soon falls into the company of wanton women who suggest that she take on a lover. She agrees, and every night for the next seventy nights, she gets ready to meet him. But she is thwarted in her attempt every single night by the parrot, which adopts the stratagem of telling her a story. The parrot typically expresses approval of its mistress' intention by agreeing that the goal of life was to seek pleasure and acknowledges the strength of sexual desire. Then it excites her interest by asking whether she had the wits to escape if any troublesome situation were to arise, as the protagonist of her next story had. Prabhāvatī naturally wants to know the details of the story and the parrot proceeds to narrate it. At the end of the story, Prabhāvatī decides not to go for her rendezvous that night.

On the seventieth night, Madana returns and Prabhāvatī has learnt the errors of her ways. Prompted by the parrot, she makes a full confession to her husband, thanking the parrot for keeping her from physical infidelity. The parrot's seventieth story is in fact a plea for forgiveness on the grounds that Prabhāvatī was not fully responsible for her fault, having been led astray by bad company.

== Stories ==
The typical story involves a wife being surprised by her husband while she is in the act of committing adultery. She has to use her wits to get out of her predicament, which she always does. In one story, she has to pass between the legs of a Yaksha, a feat impossible to achieve unless one has told the truth. The wife manages it by having her lover dress up as a lunatic and grab her — as a result, she is able to truthfully swear that no one except her husband and the lunatic has ever touched her in her life.

Frequently the stories test the limits of taboo. In one case, the wife introduces her lover as a cousin to enable his entry into the house. When the lover refuses to have sex with her on the ground that he is now her brother, she threatens to accuse him of rape and gains his acquiescence. In another story, the wife has both father and son as lovers, and she has to deal with the problem of what to do when her husband stumbles upon the scene.

The stories are often blunt, verging on pornography. In one case, the cuckolded husband has managed to grab his rival's penis while the lover was having sex with the wife literally behind the husband's back. The wife then has the unenviable task of devising a way to extricate her lover. The cuckolds are generally unaware of the situation though some times they are portrayed as simpleminded, and the wives often take advantage of their ignorance and superstitious nature. However, in one case, the husband, a king, is impressed by the lover's wit and lets his wife go with him, reasoning that while poets like the lover are rare, women like his wife are not.

The less typical story involves men being in similar situations, though in this case the trouble still comes in the form of the woman's husband rather than the man's wife. Other common stories revolve around men using the threat of embarrassment to regain gifts they showered on their lovers, often harlots. Dalliances involving unmarried women having illicit sex are very rare — with the obvious exception of prostitutes.

One story manages to simultaneously stray into zoophilia and poke fun at a divinity. It involves a woman who has promised to kiss the idol of Ganapati if she achieves a particular (wholly legitimate) goal. The mischievous idol grabs her lips and wouldn't let go. The husband has to make the idol laugh by simulating sex with a donkey to rescue his wife.

The stories form an "absorbing social document" of those times. It portrays a society where women's sexuality is openly accepted and prostitutes are accepted as a semi-legitimate part of society. In one story, a father engages a procuress to teach his son the art of safeguarding his wealth from the guiles of courtesans.

Not all stories involve sexual escapades. Some deal with other tricky situations that one can encounter in life and of them some have been lifted straight from the Panchatantra.

== Verses ==
As with many Sanskrit texts, there are verses interspersed with prose that form part of the narrative.

Some are erotic:

The best of the lover's couches

is higher on the sides
sunken at the centre
it will also bear the strong
poundings of a couple's passion

The middling bed is flat of surface
so that the night will often pass
with rarely any contact
between the bodies two.

The worst is raised at the centre,
and both its sides slope down;
even adepts in the art cannot

make love on it continuously

And some describe profound wisdom:

The rich man is wise,

he is generous and good,
the honoured kin of everyone;
but when his money goes,

so does his glory.

In some cases the verses are part of the story and actually act as part of the conversation between the characters. In others, they are merely regurgitations of earlier works such as the Hitopadesha, the Panchatantra, and even the Puranas.

== History ==
Though the collection's oldest known manuscript dates back only to the 15th century, there are references to it in other works much earlier. Current scholarship dates the book in its current form to the 12th century, though the individual stories in it are much older and are often found in the Jataka tales and in the Kathasaritsagara.

The Sanskrit Śukasaptati has a more complex textual history than is often recognized. Richard Schmidt identified three recensions: two major forms, the textus simplicior and textus ornatior, each represented by several manuscripts, and a minor textus elegantior, attested only by a single incomplete witness whose diction and grammar fall between the other two. Schmidt edited all three, and he translated the two major ones into German. The Indian printed edition prints the simplicior text—without saying so—and serves as the basis for the best-known English translation.

Authorship is uncertain. No surviving simplicior or elegantior colophon names an author, and extant ornatior manuscripts likewise lack such evidence. An ornatior copy once owned by Prof. E. Hultzsch of Halle and now of unknown whereabouts reportedly bore the colophon “śrīcintāmaṇibhaṭṭāṇāṃ śukasaptatiḥ samāptā,” mentioned only by Hertel and never independently verified. Csaba Töttössy later supported this attribution through an internal argument linking a story in the work about a wish-fulfilling jewel (cintāmaṇi) to the author’s creative method. Most modern scholars, following Hertel and Töttössy, accept this otherwise unknown Cintāmaṇi Bhaṭṭa as the author of the ornatior, but not of the simplicior.

Chronology remains debated. The simplicior and ornatior (and elegantior) appear to be parallel developments from an unknown common source rather than direct descendants of one another. Töttössy placed this archetype in the early ninth century on sociopolitical grounds and argued that the ornatior, itself a contaminated hybrid, best preserves its character. Earlier claims that the simplicior is either the original or an inept abridgment of the ornatior lack firm textual support.

== Translations ==
There have been many translations of the work into both Indian and non-Indian languages. In the 14th century, Persian scholar Nakhshabi translated it as Tutinama. This in turn was translated into Turkish and formed the basis for the German translation, which was the first one into a Western language.

The German translation, "Der textus ornatior der Çukasaptati", translated by Richard Schmidt was published in the year 1896 in Stuttgart by W Kohlhammer.

It has been translated into Telugu poetic form by Palavekari Kadiripati. Vavilla Ramaswamy Sastrulu and Sons published the work in 1935 and 1951. It was published by Andhra Pradesh Sahitya Akademi in 1979 under the editorship of B. Ramaraju.

A Malayalam translation is available for the work, named as Thatha Paranja Kathakal.

In 2000, HarperCollins India published a translation from the original Sanskrit done by Indian diplomat-scholar A N D Haksar. The book claims that this was the first rendition into English that made use of the original Sanskrit, as against the Persian translation.

== See also ==
- Tutinama
- 1911 copy of the work on Archive.org
