= Pak Kaduk =

Character in Malay folklore

Pak Kaduk also known as Pak Kadok is a character in Malay folklore. The story of Pak Kaduk originates from Malay oral tradition and is widely known in Malaysia. The character is commonly referenced in relation to events involving personal loss and misfortune, as in songs or pantun.

== Documentation ==
The story of Pak Kaduk was recorded in written form in the early 20th century, it was included in the collection Cherita Jenaka, compiled by Sir R. O. Winstedt and A. J. Sturrock and first published in 1908 under the title Pa' Kadok. The volume also contains other Malay folk tales such as Pak Pandir, Lebai Malang, Pak Belalang and Si Lunchai. It was published in Singapore by the Malayan Publishing House and reprinted several times, including a third edition in 1914 consisting of 159 pages.

== Synopsis ==
The narrative of Kaduk is generally divided into two main parts: a cockfighting episode involving a Sultan, and a subsequent episode involving a giant tapah fish. In oral tradition, these episodes are sometimes told independently.

== Cockfighting ==
According to the folk narrative, Pak Kaduk lived in the region of Perak and owned a highly regarded fighting cock known as Biring Si Kunani. The bird's reputation eventually attracted the attention of The Sultan of Perak, who challenged Pak Kaduk to a cockfight under specific conditions, including the exchange of fighting cocks and a wager involving Pak Kaduk's village and family.

In the contest, the cock originally owned by Pak Kaduk won the fight. However, because the birds had been exchanged beforehand, the victory was attributed to the Sultan. As a result, Pak Kaduk lost everything that had been wagered.

== Tapah fish ==
Following the cockfighting episode, Pak Kaduk is said to have encountered a large tapah fish along the banks of the Perak River. In the story, the fish was cut open and gold was found inside its body. Pak Kaduk took part of the gold, sewed the fish back together, and released it into the river.

He then pronounced an oath to abandon cockfighting and forbade himself and his descendants from harming or consuming tapah fish. Using the gold, Pak Kaduk is said to have redeemed his family and village.

In traditional belief associated with this narrative, it is held that descendants of Pak. Kaduk who violate this oath may suffer certain ailments, such as skin irritation or swelling.

== Seloka Pak Kaduk ==
The story of Pak Kaduk is also associated with a traditional Malay poetic form known as Seloka, and is often also classified as a folk song.

The following is the commonly cited full version of the seloka in Malay and direct English translation:

Original (Malay)	Direct translation
Aduhai malang Pak Kaduk,	Alas, poor Pak Kaduk,
Ayamnya menang kampung tergadai,	His rooster won, the village was pawned,
Ada nasi dicurahkan,	There was rice that was poured away,
Awak pulang kebuluran,	You returned starving,
Mudik menongkah surut,	Going upstream against the ebb,
Hilir menongkah pasang,	Going downstream against the flood,
Ada isteri dibunuh,	There was a wife who was killed,
Nyaris mati oleh tak makan,	Nearly died from not eating,
Masa belayar kematian angin,	While sailing, the wind died,
Sauh dilabuh bayu berpuput,	The anchor was dropped, the breeze began to blow,
Ada rumah bertandang duduk,	There was a house to visit and stay,
Rumah runtuh awak menumpang.	The house collapsed, you had to lodge with others,
