= Anak Kambing Saya =

Song
- Language: Bahasa Indonesia, Melayu
- Venue: East Nusa Tenggara, Indonesia
- Genre: Folk Song
- Songwriter(s): Saridjah Niung

Anak Kambing Saya is a folk song from East Nusa Tenggara, Indonesia. Although originally from Indonesia, this song is widely known by the people of Malaysia and Singapore titled Chan Mali Chan. The widespread recognition of this song is due to its pleasant rhythm that attracts the hearts of kindergarten or elementary school teachers to teach it to their students.

The song "Anak Kambing Saya" is defined as a happy song. Song of Anak Kambing Saya was originally created by Saridjah Niung. However, according to some people, this song means parents looking for their children. The joy in this song means the togetherness and friendship of children with their parents.

== Song Concept ==
This song is shaped like a question and answer session. This alone can be seen in the first and second lines where the first line contains a question sentence, while the second line contains a news sentence that continues as if answering the first line. This occurs between the third sentence and the fourth sentence.

== Lyrics ==
Mana di mana anak kambing saya?
Anak kambing tuan ada di pohon waru
Mana di mana jantung hati saya?
Jantung hati tuan ada di kampung baru

Caca marica he hey
Caca marica he hey
Caca marica ada di kampung baru

Caca marica he hey
Caca marica he hey
Caca marica ada di kampung baru
