= Nakhshabi =

Persian physician and writer

Ziya' al-Din Nakhshabi was a 14th-century Persian physician and Sufi living in India. He died in 1350.

According to a statement in a manuscript now at The National Library of Medicine, Nakhshabi himself transcribed and illustrated a Persian translation made of a Hindi version of a Sanskrit treatise on sexual hygiene.

There are 5 full-page miniatures painted in a variety of opaque watercolors with gilt and two half or three-quarter miniatures, all of a provincial Mughal style typical of north-west India, especially Kashmir, in the 18th century.

No other particulars are known of Nakhshabi.

There are, however, a number of other Persian manuscripts which associate the name Ziya' Nakhshabi or Dhiya' al-Din Nakhshabi with versions of this ultimately Sanskrit treatise on sexual hygiene. And he is also known to have edited and added his own verses to a Persian translation called Tutinama of a Sanskrit collection of 52 tales narrated by a parrot (tuti in Persian) and a nightingale (sharak) to a woman in order to keep her away from a lover while her husband, a traveling merchant, was absent.

== See also ==
- List of Iranian scientists

== Sources ==
For treatises attributed to him, see Fateme Keshavarz, A Descriptive and Analytical Catalogue of Persian Manuscripts in the Library of the Wellcome Institute for the History of Medicine (London: Wellcome Institute for the History of Medicine, 1986), pp 377–378 no 211 and pp 633–634 no 450.
