= Tutinama =

14th-century series of stories

Tutinama (Tales of a Parrot)
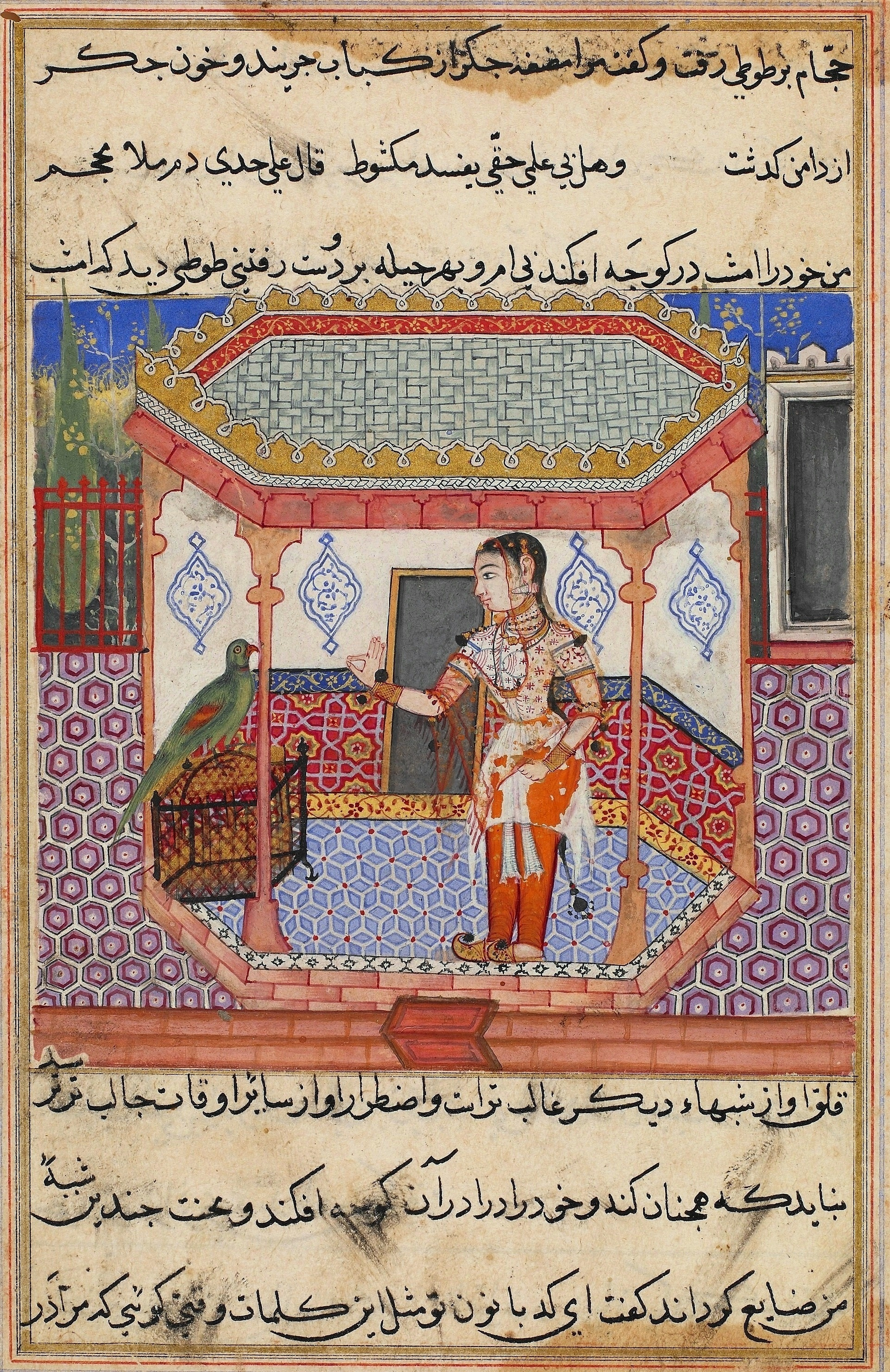
- Parrot addressing Khojasta
- Author: Nakhshabi
- Language: Persian
- Genre: Fables
- Publication date: 14th century
- Publication place: India

Tutinama (Persian: طوطی‌نامه), literal meaning "Tales of a Parrot", is a 14th-century series of 52 stories in Persian. The work remains well-known largely because of a number of lavishly illustrated manuscripts, especially a version containing 250 miniature paintings commissioned by the Mughal Emperor Akbar in the 1550s. The Persian text used was edited in the 14th century from an earlier anthology 'Seventy Tales of the Parrot' in Sanskrit compiled under the title Śukasaptati (a part of katha literature) dated to the 12th century. In India, parrots (in light of their purported conversational abilities) are popular as storytellers in works of fiction.

The adventure stories narrated by a parrot, night after night, for 52 successive nights, are moralistic stories to persuade his female owner Khojasta not to commit any adulterous act with any lover, in the absence of her husband. She is always on the point of leaving the house to meet her lover, until the loyal parrot detains her by a fascinating story.

Several illustrated manuscript copies survive, the most famous made for the Mughal Emperor Akbar over the five years after he ascended the throne in 1556, by two Persian artists named Mir Sayyid Ali and Abdus Samad working in the court workshop. This is almost entirely in the Cleveland Museum of Art. A second version made for Akbar is now dispersed among several museums, but with the largest part in the Chester Beatty Library in Dublin; this is thought to date to about 1580.

== Text ==
The authorship of the text of the Tutinama is credited to Ziya'al-Din Nakhshabi or just Nakhshabi, a Persian physician and a Sufi saint who had migrated to Badayun, Uttar Pradesh in India in the 14th century, who wrote in the Persian language. He had translated and/or edited a classical Sanskrit version of the stories similar to Tutinama into Persian, around 1335 AD. It is conjectured that this small book of short stories, moralistic in theme, influenced Akbar during his formative years. It is also inferred that since Akbar had a harem (of women siblings, wives and women servants), the moralistic stories had specific orientation towards the control of women.

== Akbar's first version ==
The two artists Mir Sayyid Ali and Abd al-Samad were invited by Humayun around 1530–40 to teach this art to himself and to his son Akbar. Initially, the artists came to Kabul with Humayun (where he was in exile) and in later years shifted to Delhi when he won back his empire from the Suri Dynasty. The artists then moved to Fatehpur Sikri with the Mughal Emperor Akbar, where a huge workshop of artists were engaged in producing miniatures. This type of painting came to be known as Mughal painting, during Akbar's reign from 1556 to 1605 (when under Emperor Akbar's leadership the Mughal empire became most powerful). Akbar provided personal patronage to promote this form of miniature paintings, not only through Iranian artists but also involved a large number of Indian artists who were also well versed in local styles of such miniature paintings that were produced in the imperial workshops. It thus developed as a unique blend of Indian, Persian and Islamic styles.

Most of the paintings are now in the Cleveland Museum of Art; some are also in the British Library. This became the precursor for many more refined forms of Mughal miniature painting portfolios such as the Hamzanama (Adventures of Amir Hamza), Akbarnama (Book of Akbar), Jahangirnama (Tuzk-e-Jahangiri an autobiography of Mughal emperor Jahangir) and so forth, which were created during the reign of subsequent Moghul rulers (16th century to 19th century) as Mughal paintings, but also with distinct Indian, Hindu, Jain and Buddhist influences. The Mughal style covered mainly portraits of Mughal emperors, Queens, court scenes, hunting scenes, special ceremonies, battle scenes, love scenes and various activities of royal rulers. This format of miniatures was also widely adopted by Rajput and Malwa rulers.

In one miniature the figure of the king in the story is the earliest known portrait of Akbar.

== Theme of the story ==
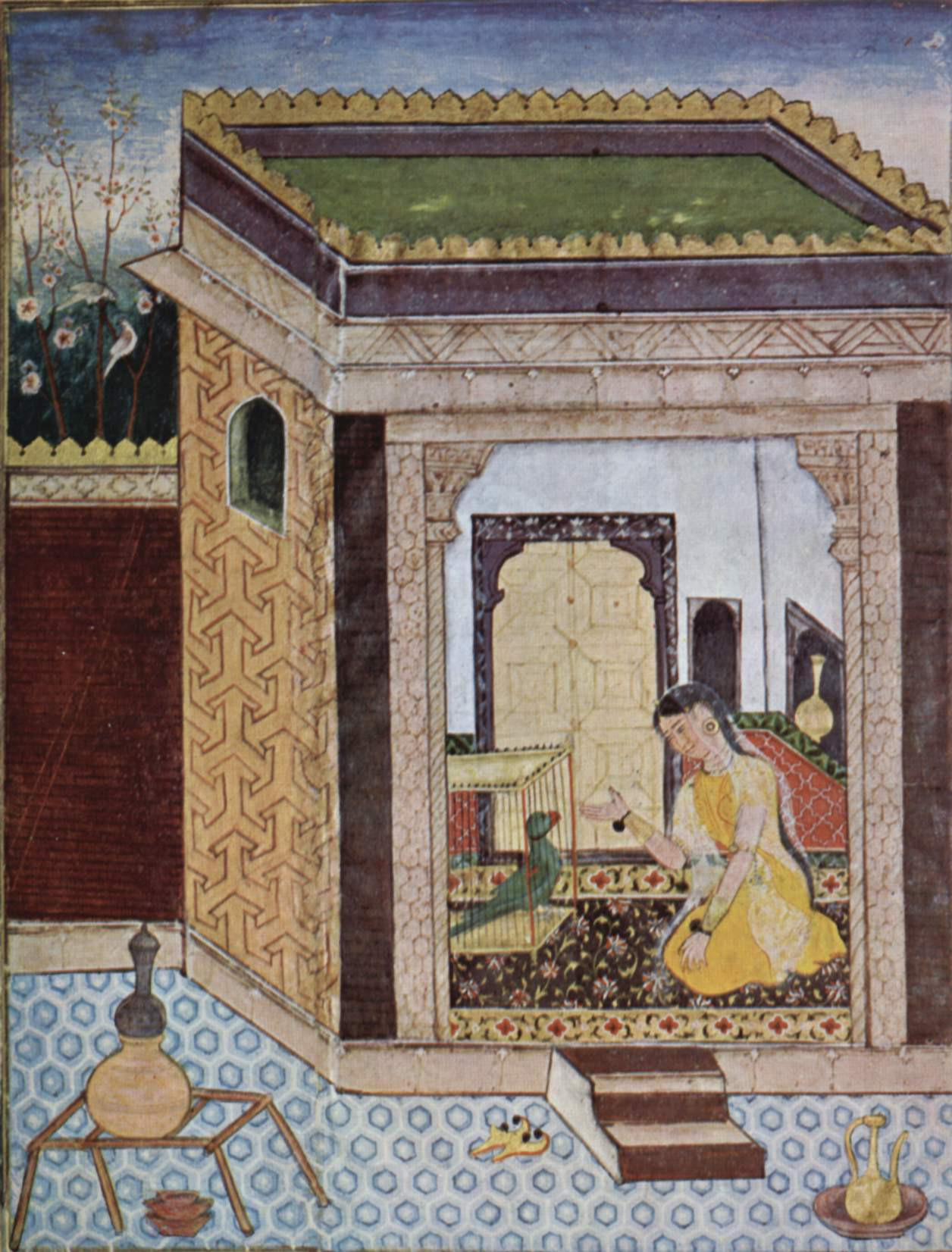
The Parrot addresses Khojasta, a scene from the Tutinama (1556–1565) paintings

The main narrator of the 52 stories of Tutinama is a parrot, who tells stories to his owner, a woman called Khojasta, in order to prevent her from committing any illicit affair while her husband (a merchant by the name Maimunis) is away on business. The merchant had gone on his business trip leaving behind his wife in the company of a mynah and a parrot. The wife strangles the mynah for advising her not to indulge in any illicit affair. The parrot, realising the gravity of the situation, adopts a more indirect approach of narrating fascinating stories over the next fifty-two nights. The stories are narrated every successive night for 52 nights as an entertaining episode to keep Khojasta's attention and distract her from going out.

One story

A particular tale narrated by the parrot to rivet the attention of his mistress, as she is about to leave the house in the night, is also depicted in the 35th to 37th paintings in the illustrated version of the Tutinama. The story related by the parrot is of a Brahmin boy falling in love with a princess, considered a fated (doomed) situation. But a solution to this is provided by a magician friend of the Brahmin in the form of magic beads to help his friend to turn into a beautiful woman to seek entry into the palace to be with his loved one. The magician further facilitates the meeting of his friend with the king's daughter by telling the King that the girl in question was his daughter-in-law. On seeking entry into the palace the Brahmin discloses his true identity to his adored princess. But a twist is introduced into the tale with the King's son beholding a beautiful girl (the Brahmin in disguise) while taking bath in a pond falls in love with her. To avoid discovery of his true identity, the Brahmin runs away with the King's daughter. The magician then appears before the King seeking return of his daughter-in-law. But the King realising the true state of the two missing girls, compensates the magician with rich gifts. The gifts are passed on by the magician to his Brahmin friend and his wife to enable them to lead a happy life. The parrot concludes the narration, towards day break, with the advice to Kojasta that she should also have everything in life including her husband.

== Style of paintings ==
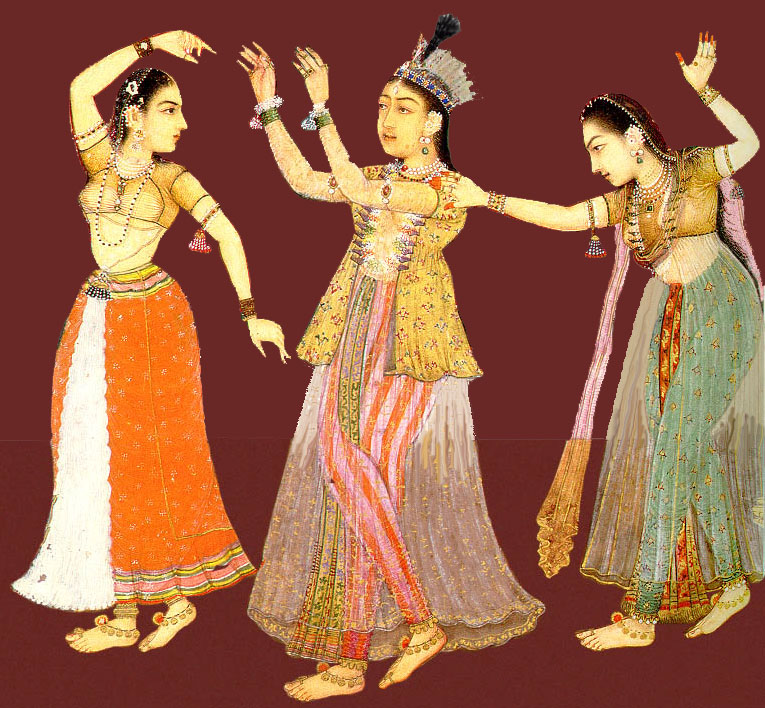
Mughal women dancing Kathak style

It is said that the text of the Tutinama was written in Nasta'liq calligraphy style. But each of the paintings seen in various libraries across the world focus on a single topic or episode of the stories. The straightforwardness of expressions seen in the paintings is attributed to the influence of pre-Mughal paintings. Several portfolios of Tutinama are also stated to be similar to the Malwa manuscripts with illustrations (dated to 1439 AD) but with distinct perfection. The difference is traced to the tasteful colours in Tutinama paintings, which make it rich in colours with graded quality.

The popular dance form of Kathak, considered a combination of Indian and Persian forms, got a medium for display in the paintings of the Tutinama, the Akbarnama and the Tarrikh-e-Khandan-e-Timuria. In these paintings, men and women are shown wearing long flowing robes and high conical caps in standing positions. Even some paintings depicted two different groups of dancers. It is stated that 350 dancers, who were brought to Akbar's court from Iran by force, probably represented the ancient traditions of dances of Iran. It is inferred that over the years, assimilation of the Persian and the Indian people took place and provided the backdrop for the present Kathak dance style in India.

== See also ==
- Sindbad-Nameh
