= Bongai =

Malay traditional musical ensemble

- Other names: Rentak Kuda
- Classification: Percussion instrument; Idiophone; Gong
- Developed: Malaysia

More articles or information
- Gamelan; Kulintangan

Bongai
- Stylistic origins: Music of Malaysia
- Cultural origins: Malaysia

Bongai also known as Rontak Kudo, is a traditional folk music genre from the Malaysian state of Negeri Sembilan. It can be sung as a solo, a duet or in a group with or without musical accompaniment.

== History ==
Bongai reached its peak of fame in the 1950s where it was considered a must in any ceremony held especially wedding ceremonies in Negeri Sembilan. It is also performed for specific purposes, especially as entertainment during the evenings, after work. Bongai simply refers to the ceremony of reciting a poem through song, it is sometimes accompanied by instrumentation. It was historically performed at night.

== Instruments ==
The musical instruments used in Bongai include: violin, rebana, gong, gendang, salung and tumbuk kalang. Besides these basic instruments, other instruments such as caklempong, bangsi, accordion and others can also be used.

Example of songs sung as part of Bongai include:

- "Anak Bocek"
- "Budu Landai"
- "Cantik Manis"
- "Donak Donai"
- "Kapeh"

== See also ==
- Gamelan
- Kulintangan
