= Soleram =

Folk song from Johor-Riau Sultanate

Song by Indonesian
- Language: Classical Malay
- English title: Soleram, Suliram
- Genre: Folk Song
- Songwriter: Indonesian

Soleram

"Suliram"

Song by The Weavers

from the album All Over This Land: Singles As & Bs and More
- Language: Indonesian
- English title: Suliram
- Released: 1949
- Genre: Folk Song

"Suliram (Indonesian Lullaby)"

Song by Pete Seeger

from the album The Complete Bowdoin College Concert, 1960
- Language: Indonesian
- English title: Suliram
- Released: 1960
- Genre: Folk Song
- Length: 3:13

"Suliram"

Song by Miriam Makeba

from the album Miriam Makeba (1960)
- Language: Indonesian
- English title: Suliram
- Released: 1960
- Genre: Folk Song
- Length: 3:13

"Soleram"

Song by Orkes Irama

from the album Mari Bersuka Ria dengan Irama Lenso
- Language: Indonesian
- English title: Soleram
- Released: 1965
- Genre: Folk Song; Pop Song
- Length: 3:59
- Label: Irama
- Songwriter: Muhammad Arief
- Producer: Jack Lesmana

"Soleram"

Song by D'lloyd

from the album 20 Tembang Pilihan D'lloyd
- Language: Indonesian
- English title: Soleram
- Released: 1970
- Genre: Folk Song; Pop Song
- Length: 2:47

Soleram or Suliram (also known as Soreram, or Suriram) is a folk song from Riau, Indonesia. It is also a well-known folk song in Malaysia. This song is melodious and sung in a gentle rhythm, with lyrics that are relatively short and easy to remember. A version popular in Indonesia was written by Muhammad Arief, a musician from Banyuwangi.

The Soleram song has many variations in its lyrics. The song, thought to be a lullaby of the Riau people, may contain messages that parents want to convey to their children at bedtime, such as words of endearment, being modest and holding on to old friends.

== Background ==
Soleram or Suliram is a traditional song of the Riau people. The song is found in other regions outside Riau. In Malaysia, it is a popular lullaby spelt Suriram, and the country also lays claim to the song. The verses may be in the form of a Malay pantun with an ABAB rhyming scheme, there are, however, variations in lyrics and rhymes in different versions.

Soleram or Suliram is one of the Indonesian folk songs that caught the interest of the music community worldwide, notably after The Weavers (an American folk music quartet) recorded the song in 1949. Pete Seeger who was a member of The Weavers also performed the song. and Miriam Makeba recorded a version in 1960. In Indonesia, the song has been recorded by music groups such as Orkes Irama in 1965 and D'lloyd in 1970. The song has been recorded in Malaysia by singers such as Dayang Nurfaizah and Siti Nurhaliza in albums of children's songs.

== Lyrics ==
There are many variations in the lyrics found in Indonesia and Malaysia, a version recorded by singers such as Pete Seeger and Miriam Makeba is as follows:

Indonesian

Suliram, Suliram, ram, ram
Suliram yang manis
Aduhai indung seorang
Bijaklah sana dipandang manis

Tinggilah tinggi si matahari
Suliram, anaklah kerbau mati tertambat
Suliram, sudah lamalah saya mencari
Baru sekarang saya mendapat

English

Suliram, Suliram, ram, ram
Suliram, who is so sweet
Oh, whose child is this
So right to look so sweet

High, oh, high is the Sun
Suliram, the tethered calf of the buffalo has died
Suliram, long have I sought for you
But it's only now that I have you

Some versions popular in Indonesia are variants of the following:

Indonesian

Soleram, Soleram
Soleram, anak yang manis
Anak manis janganlah dicium sayang
Kalau dicium merahlah pipinya

Satu, dua, Tiga dan empat
Lima, enam, tujuh delapan
Kalau tuan dapat kawan baru sayang
Kawan lama ditinggalkan jangan

English

Soleram, Soleram
Soleram, a child so sweet
Do not kiss, dear sweet child
If kissed, red will be the cheeks

One, two, three and four
Five, six, seven and eight
Should you find a new friend, my dear
Abandon not your old friends

== See also ==
- Indonesian culture
- Indonesian music
- List of Indonesian folk songs
- Chan Mali Chan
- Rasa Sayang
