= Chan Mali Chan =

Malay folk song

Song
- Language: Malay
- Genre: Folk Song

"Chan Mali Chan" is a folk song popular in Malaysia and Singapore. The song is a light-hearted song that may have its origin in a Malay poem pantun. In Indonesia, there are songs that have similar tones such as "Anak Kambing Saya" ("My Lamb" or "My Baby Goat") written by Saridjah Niung. It is commonly sung as a children's song.

There are different versions of "Chan Mali Chan", a common version that starts with talking about looking for a lamb/kid interpreted as parents looking for their children, and that it's about the togetherness and bond between children and their parents. Others suggest it is a flirtatious love song. A version was sung in the 1960 Singapore black-white film, Isi Neraka.

== Lyrics ==
There are many variations in the lyrics found in Indonesia, Malaysia and Singapore. This song may be presented in a question and answer format; the first line asks: "Where is my lamb", and the second line answers where the lamb is (different versions of the song may have different answers). Other questions may follow, such as "Where is my darling/baby", etc., followed by answers to these questions.

=== Version in Malaysia and Singapore ===
A common version found in Malaysia and Singapore:

Malay

Di mana dia anak kambing saya?
Anak kambing saya yang makan daun talas
Di mana dia buah hati saya?
Buah hati saya bagai telur dikupas
(Chorus)
Chan mali chan, chan mali chan
Chan mali chan, ketipung payung

English

Where is he, my little lamb/kid?
My little lamb is eating taro leaves
Where is he, my darling/baby?
My darling/baby is like an egg with its shell peeled (Note: This refers to the smooth skin of a person's appearance.)
(Chorus)
Chan mali chan, chan mali chan (Note: The meaning of "Chan mali chan" is uncertain, but "mali" has been interpreted as a "mari" ("to come"), so it may be read as an invitation to someone named "Chan" to come)
Chan mali chan, ketipung payung (Note: Ketipung (a small kendang drum, sound of drumming, or a word used to time beat in games by children) and payung (umbrella) could be interpreted as terms of affection or words to beat in time)}

(The verses may be repeated with the same or different questions and answers.)

== See also ==
- Soleram
- Rasa sayang
