= Hikayat Bayan Budiman =

Hikayat Bayan Budiman (Jawi script: حكايت بيان بوديمان ) is the Malay version of a tradition that begins with the Sanskrit Śukasaptati, The Parrot's Seventy Tales, an Indian work, in which a parrot tells 70 stories in order to prevent a woman from going on the wrong path. These chain stories, like the Arabian Nights, form the crux of the Indian storytelling tradition. An unknown author compiled it in the 6th century AD.

It was later translated into Persian during ‘Ala-ud-din Khilji’s time (1296–1316) and titled Tuti Nameh. In this process, Muslim characters replaced the Hindu ones. Versions of this fine collection of popular tales were transported from Persian adaptations that the Malay text was translated. According to the Malay text, this translation was done by a certain Kadi Hassan in 773 AH (1371 AD).

The texts, which originally are written in classical Malay in Jawi script, has been transcribed to Rumi (Latin) alphabet which is the standard alphabet for the modern Malay (Malay and Indonesian). The text is the oldest text in the corpus dated 1371, which, according to Malay Concordance Project (MCP) by Ian Proudfoot, contains 69761 words.

A. Jehgoh, University of Lund, Sweden in his work Arabic Elements in Hikayat Bayan Budiman has analysed the Arabic loanwords in Hikayat Bayan Budiman.
