= Asyik =

Dance of Malaysia and Thailand

Asyik dance
- Native name: Tarian Asyik
- Origin: Malaysia

Asyik (literally "beloved"/"besotted") is a classical royal court dance popular in Patani and Kelantan. According to Hikayat Patani, the dance was created in 1644 to entertain the grieving Ratu Kuning over the loss of her favorite bird. The dance's name "the beloved" could have been referring to the lost bird.

The performance begins with ten beautifully costumed dancers entering the dancing hall and sitting gracefully. The prima donna, also known as Puteri Asyik ("the princess of love") will then appear and the dance begins with gracious and delicate body movements and gestures.

The orchestra of the dance consists of eleven types of gedombak asyik (a small drum), gambang (a xylophone-like instrument, usually made of slabs of wood or bronze), and a rebab (a bowed lute).

Although it begins as a court dance, over time, the dance became popular among common people and used as folk entertainment during festivals and marriages.
