= Sang Kelembai =

Giantess in Malay folklore

In Malay folklore, Sang Kelembai (Jawi: سڠ كلمباي) was a giantess generally described as about thrice as big as a normal person, and said to be ugly with thick eyebrows, big fat nose, big elephant ears and fangs. She was feared not only for her looks but also for her power of turning any animal or human being into stone just by greeting them. She is known to have originated from the hinterland of Pahang, but popularly associated with many origin myth especially of geological rocks with peculiar shapes throughout the Malay world. In literature, her petrifaction power is commonly described as Sumpahan Sang Kelembai ('The curse of Sang Kelembai').

== The legend ==
Sang Kelembai was said to have once lived on the banks of the Pahang River where she fed on fruit, meat and the soft leaves at the top of bamboo plants. Before being cursed and acquiring her petrifaction power, she was described as a giantess who love playing with children. She was also in good terms with the village folks and the people used to supply her food. She began to realize her power after a cow elephant and her calf turned into stone after she greet them in the forest. On the following day, she arrived at a village where a feast was being held. She greeted a cook but the unfortunate man immediately turned into stone. She turned to other villagers to apologize but they too suffered the same fate.

There was a time when she happened to pass by an old man who was cooking a big pot of broth that greeted her, but she refused to return his greeting. Because of his poor eyesight, he did not recognize her as the infamous Sang Kelembai and invited her to join the feast by saying, sila, sila ('come','come'). In her haste to get away, Sang Kelembai tripped and started her latah as she exclaimed the same sila, sila. Upon hearing the words, the old man was instantly turned to stone. Sang Kelembai was so upset at what happened to the innocent old man that she lifted the big cooking pot and threw it into the Pahang River.

As she became deeply depressed by all that had been happening, Sang Kelembai became a wanderer and went into hiding. One day she reached a village she had never seen before. She slipped into the fruit orchards to find some bananas but was instantly spotted. The villagers, who had been warned about her evil power, quickly gather to discuss how they could drive her away. They decided to place a big toothless old woman in a cradle along the path of Sang Kelembai. They also arranged some tortoises around the cradle and surrounded it with short stumps of bamboo. When Sang Kelembai was making her way out of the village, she came upon the old woman lying in the cradle. She was astounded by what she thought was a huge baby, and that the tortoises were enormously fleas. She probably also thought the baby must be eating the bamboo as if they were sugarcane. She was filled with dread of a village that must be populated by giants, perhaps bigger and stronger than she was. She fearfully ran away into the jungle as far as she could and was never seen again.

== Origin myth of Kota Gelanggi Caves ==
Kota Gelanggi Caves is a limestone cave complex said to be hundreds of millions of years old, located in the Jerantut District, Pahang, Malaysia. All of the caves here are mysteriously named as kota (Malay for 'fortress' or 'city'), and commonly associated with orang bunian. Among the caves are Kota Tongkat, Kota Kepayang, Kota Rehut, Kota Gelap, Kota Angin, Kota Jin and Kota Balai.

The mysterious complex of caves has been the source of many colorful tales. Legend has it that the site is the remains of an ancient kingdom known as Gelang Kiu, which in the local Aslian languages means the “Treasure House of Jewels”, ruled by Raja Gelanggi. A local tale surrounding the kingdom is that of a war or curse that befell Gelang Kiu, which brought an end to the city. It tells the story of a beautiful princess of Raja Gelanggi who was betrothed to Raja Usul of Bera. At the same time, Raja Mambang of Lipis also wanted to marry the princess and a war ensued. Raja Usul emerged victorious after killing Raja Mambang and won the princess hand in marriage. The vengeful father of Raja Mambang summoned the Sang Kelembai for revenge, and a curse was cast and turned everything into stone, wiping the kingdom off the map.

== See also ==
- Medusa – Female monster in Greek mythology

== Bibliography ==
- Harun Mat Piah (2003), Sastera rakyat Malaysia, Indonesia, Negara Brunei Darussalam : Suatu Perbandingan ('Folk Literature of Malaysia, Indonesia, Negara Brunei Darussalam : A comparative study'), Dewan Bahasa dan Pustaka, ISBN 9836277714
- Leong, Leong (2015), Asian Folk Tales and Legends, MPH Publishing, ISBN 9789674152963
- Mohamed Zahir Haji Ismail (2000), The legends of Langkawi, Utusan Publications, ISBN 9676110272
