= Hikayat Malim Dewa =

Hikayat Malim Dewa (Jawi: حكاية ماليم ديوا) is a historical Malay literary work. The identity of the author is unknown. It is among few surviving Malay historical literary works.
