= Gurindam =

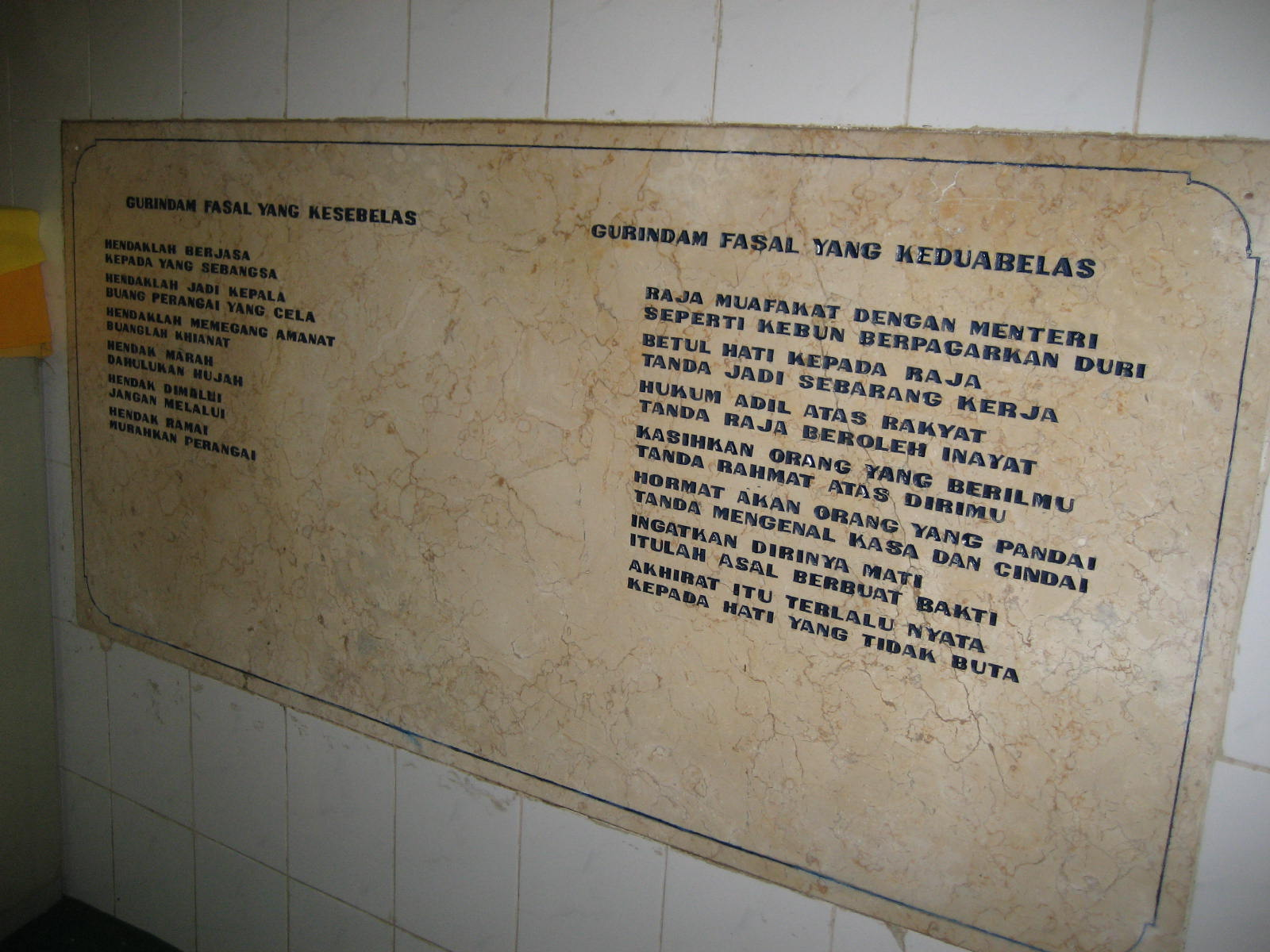
Gurindam #11-12 traditional Malay poetry in Penyengat Island of Indonesia

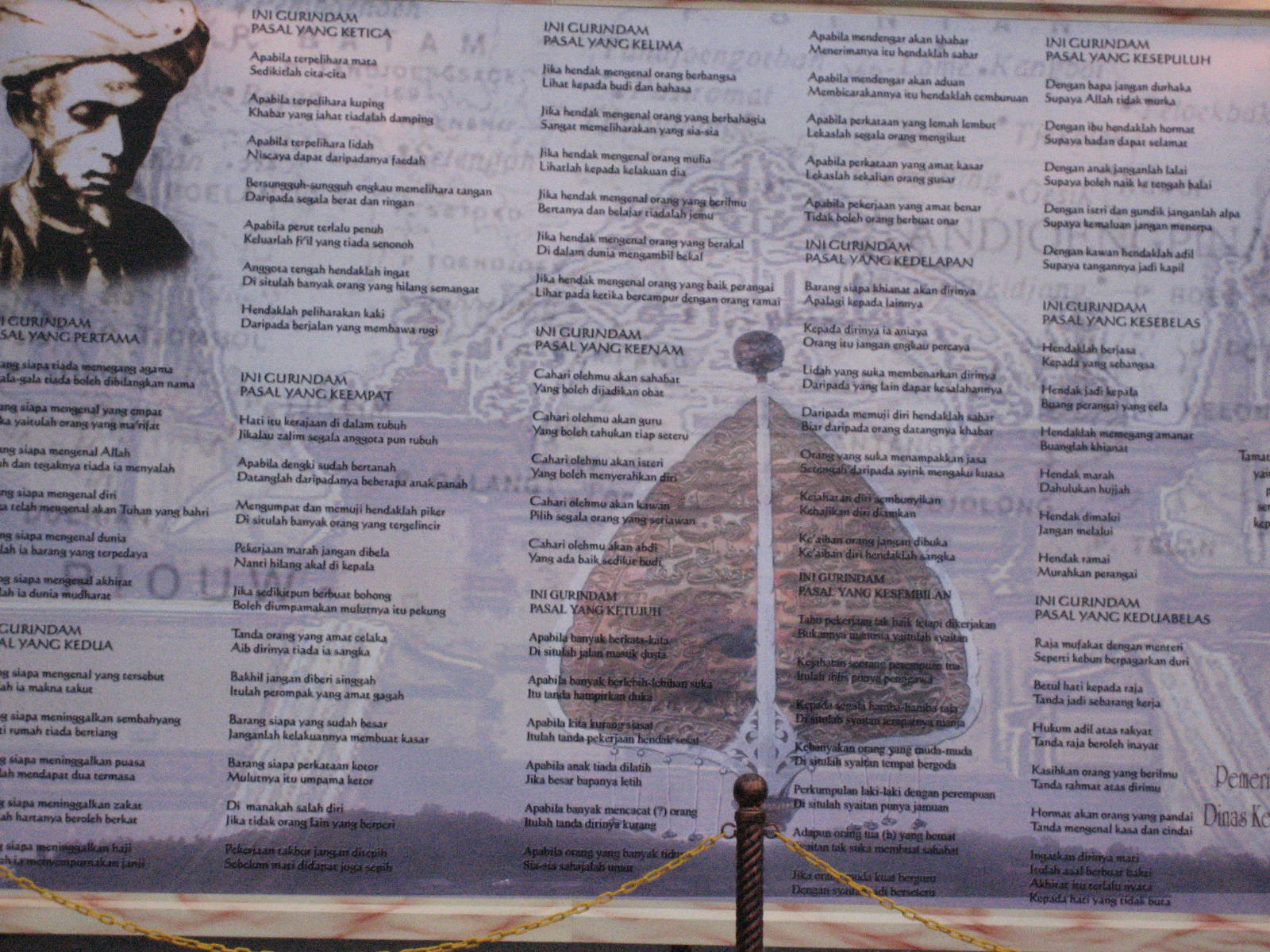
Gurindam 12 of Raja Ali Haji in Tanjung Pinang monument

Gurindam (Jawi: ڬوريندام) is a type of irregular verse form of traditional Malay poetry. It is a combination of two clauses where the relative clause forms a line and is thus linked to the second line, or the main clause. Each pair of lines (stanza) provides complete ideas within the pair and has the same rhyme in its end. There is no limit on the number words per line and neither the rhythm per line is fixed.

Although Gurindam looks similar with Syair which also have the same rhyme at the end of each stanza, it differs in the sense that it completes the message within the same stanza while Syair unfolding the message in several stanzas. The first line of gurindam is known as syarat (protasis) and the second line is jawab (apodosis). In other words, the first line states a condition while the second line provides the answer.

One of the most well known literary works on Gurindam was the Gurindam Dua Belas (Twelve Gurindam) of Raja Ali Haji written in 1847. Below is the 5th clause of the famous 12 Gurindam:

Jawi script

،جك هندق مڠنل اورڠ بربڠسا
،ليهت كڤد بودي دان بهاس

،جك هندق مڠنل اورڠ يڠ بربهاڬيا
،ساڠت ممليهاراكن يڠ سيا-سيا

،جك هندق مڠنل اورڠ مليا
،ليهتله كڤد كلاكوان دي

،جك هندق مڠنل اورڠ يڠ برعلمو
،برتاڽ دان بلاجر تيادله جمو

،جك هندق مڠنل اورڠ يڠ برعقل
،د دالم دنيا مڠمبيل بكل

،جك هندق مڠنل اورڠ يڠ باءيق ڤراڠاي

.ليهت ڤد كتيك برچمڤور دڠن اورڠ راماي
Rumi script

Jika hendak mengenal orang berbangsa,
Lihat kepada budi dan bahasa

Jika hendak mengenal orang yang berbahagia
Sangat memeliharakan yang sia-sia

Jika hendak mengenal orang mulia
Lihatlah kepada kelakuan dia

Jika hendak mengenal orang yang berilmu
Bertanya dan belajar tiadalah jemu

Jika hendak mengenal orang yang berakal
Di dalam dunia mengambil bekal

Jika hendak mengenal orang yang baik perangai
Lihat pada ketika bercampur dengan orang ramai

Rhyming English translation

If the well born you would identify
Look for their kindness and courtesy

Those who are happy and prosper
Waste and idleness do forswear

If the noble you would perceive
Look you at how they behave

If it's ones with knowledge you require
Of questions and learning they never tire

As for the wise, it's easy to tell
In this world, for the next they provide well

If the good natured are whom you seek,
When they're with company you must peek
