= Hikayat Inderaputera =

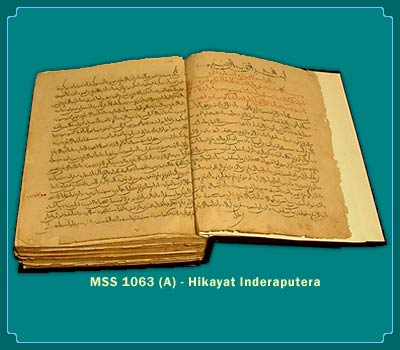
The Hikayat Inderaputera

Hikayat Inderaputera (حكاية ايندراڤوترا) is a Malay literary work, a hikayat relating the adventures of Prince Inderaputera, son of the king of Semantapura. Probably composed in the late 16th century, as Nuruddin al-Raniri condemned the Hikayat Inderaputera, together with the Hikayat Seri Rama and other tales ‘of no religious value’ in his book Bustan al-Salatin.
