= Rasa Sayang =

Traditional folk song

"Rasa Sayang" (pronounced [ˈrasa 'sajaŋ], literally "loving feeling") or "Rasa Sayange" (pronounced [ˈrasa 'sajaŋɛ]) in Indonesia is a folk song from the Malay Archipelago, popular in Brunei, Indonesia, Malaysia and Singapore.

Being a pantun, "Rasa Sayang" has an alternating rhyming scheme of ABAB with equal syllabic lengths to maintain rhythm, with the sole exception being the opening verse, which has a different syllabic length with the other verses. Divided into two, the first and second line are often unrelated from the third and fourth, the first and second line is used to establish a rhyming pattern while the third and fourth line is the desired message to be given to the listener.

== In Brunei, Malaysia, and Singapore ==
"Rasa Sayang"

Song
- Language: Malay
- English title: A Loving Feeling
- Genre: Folk Song

"Rasa Sayang" (also known as "Rasa Sayang Hey") is a Malay folk song. The basis of "Rasa Sayang" is similar to Dondang Sayang and Malay folk songs, which take their form from the pantun, a traditional ethnic Malay poetic form.

Rasa Sayang

Malay lyrics

Rasa sayang, hey!
Rasa sayang sayang, hey!
Hey, lihat nona jauh,
Rasa sayang sayang, hey!

Buah cempedak di luar pagar,
Ambil galah tolong jolokkan;
Kami budak baru belajar,
Kalau salah tolong tunjukkan.

Pulau Pandan jauh ke tengah,
Gunung Daik bercabang tiga;
Hancur badan dikandung tanah,
Budi yang baik dikenang juga.

Dua tiga kucing berlari,
Mana sama si kucing belang;
Dua tiga boleh ku cari,
Mana sama adik seorang.

Pisang emas dibawa berlayar,
Masak sebiji di atas peti;
Hutang emas boleh dibayar,
Hutang budi dibawa mati.

English translation

I've got that loving feeling, hey!
I've got that loving feeling, hey!
See that girl in the distance,
I've got that loving feeling, hey!

The cempedak fruit is outside the fence,
Take a pole and poke it down;
I'm just a child trying to learn,
So if I'm wrong, then please tell me.

Pandan Island far in midst,
With the three peaked Mount Daik;
While the body decomposes in earth,
Good deeds remain to be remembered.

Two or three cats are running around,
With the striped one which can vie;
Two or three I can find,
Which girl can compare with you.

Pisang emas brought on a sailing trip,
One ripens on a box;
If gold is owed, it can be repaid,
But if it is gratitude, it is carried to the grave.

Poetic English Translation

I've got that loving feeling, hey!
I've got that loving feeling, hey!
See that girl in the distance,
I've got that loving feeling, hey!

Where cempedak tree grows without the fence,
Go prod them gently with a stake;
A youthful learner I, so hence,
Be please to point out each mistake.

The Pandan Island is far from land,
Have three peaks does the Daik Mountain;
Though the self has rot in the sand,
The good deeds are never forgotten.

Two or three cats are running around,
The cat with stripes is the one superior;
Two or three (gals) can be easily found,
But not the same as having you, my dear.

With golden plantains sail away,
Whilst on a chest lies one that's ripe;
The debts of gold we can repay,
But debts of kindness last through life.

== In Indonesia ==
"Rasa Sayange"
- A music sheet for piano of Rasa Sajang E from Krontjong-Liederen, 1925

Song
- Language: Ambonese Malay
- English title: A Loving Feeling
- Genre: Folk Song

Rasa Sayange

"Rasa Sayange" is an Ambonese Malay folk song, a Malay creole originating from Maluku, specifically Ambon.

Ambonese Malay lyrics

Rasa sayange
Rasa sayang, sayange
E, lihat dari jauh,
Rasa sayang, sayange

Mana kancil akan dikejar
Kedalam pasar cobalah cari
Masih kecil rajin belajar
Sudah besar senanglah diri

Kalau ada sumur di ladang
Boleh kita menumpang mandi
Kalau ada umurku panjang
Boleh kita berjumpa lagi

English translation

Oh, I've got that loving feeling
I've got that endearing, loving feeling
Hey, looking from afar
I've got that endearing, loving feeling

If there's a mouse-deer, we'll chase it
We'll try and go search in the market
When you study early from a young age
You'll be happy when you grow older

If there's a well in the field
We can stop by to wash ourselves
If I live long to an old age
We can meet each other again

Another more modern variant with an additional Indonesian verse goes as follows:

Original lyrics

Rasa sayange
Rasa sayang, sayange
E, lihat dari jauh,
Rasa sayang, sayange

Jalan-jalan ke Surabaya
Jangan lupa membeli pita
Jangan suka memandang saya
Nanti bisa sakit mata

Kalau ada sumur di ladang
Boleh kita menumpang mandi
Kalau ada umurku panjang
Boleh kita berjumpa lagi

English translation

Oh, I've got that loving feeling
I've got that endearing, loving feeling
Hey, looking from afar
I've got that endearing, loving feeling

Take a vacation to Surabaya
And don't forget to buy ribbons
Stop looking at me like that
You're going to hurt your eyes

If there's a well in the field
We can stop by to wash ourselves
If I live long to an old age
We can meet each other again

The song Rasa Sayange contains elements of Moluccan Malay (North Moluccan Malay or Ambonese Malay), specifically in the suffix -e. This suffix is well-known and commonly used in the Moluccan Malay language. It is also applied to several other phrases, such as Ambon Manise or Nona Manise.

== 2007 Malaysian tourism response ==
Controversy over the song's provenance came to a head in 2007 when the Malaysian Tourism Board released the Rasa Sayang Commercial, an advertisement used as part of Malaysia's "Truly Asia" tourism campaign. Some Indonesians have accused Malaysia of heritage theft. Indonesian news sites reported that it is a song of the Maluku Islands, that it has appeared in early Indonesian films and recordings. Around a thousand Indonesians demonstrated outside the Malaysian embassy in Jakarta in November 2007 to protest the use of "Rasa Sayang" and other cultural items such as Reog Ponorogo in such adverts. In order to prevent what they considered cultural appropriation, the Indonesian government started making an inventory of such songs as cultural properties of the country.

Malaysia in turn argued that the song is widely sung throughout the Malay Archipelago, and that it belongs to the people of the archipelago, Malaysians and Indonesians alike. In cases where people have been migrating, trading and intermingling for centuries in a region, it may be difficult to make claim of cultural property. Malaysian Tourism Minister Adnan Mansor stated, "It is a folk song from the Nusantara (Malay Archipelago) and we are part of the Nusantara.". The Malaysian Minister of Culture, Arts and Heritage, Rais Yatim, recognize that "Rasa Sayange" is a shared property, between Indonesia and Malaysia.

== Early recordings and uses ==
From 1928 to 1929, an ensemble of Indonesian students from Dutch East Indies called Krontjong Orchest Eurasia recorded several kroncong music in the Netherlands, including a rendition of "Rasa Sayange" (Old Spelling: Rasa Sajang E) that was released in 1928, labeled as a Manado song (Dutch: Menadoneesch Lied).

In 1938, a British documentary film titled "FIVE FACES" features "Rasa Sayang" as one of the background songs.

In a report from the Singaporean newspaper The Straits Times on May 10, 1958, an unnamed singer in British Malaya confessed to having sung the "Rasa Sayang" in front of a public audience for the first time over 20 years ago. This suggests that the song was already known and performed publicly as early as the 1930s.

In 1939, "Rasa Sayang" was among the songs played on Penang radio.

In 1943, "Rasa Sayang" appeared in the Japanese film Marai no Tora, which depicted the exploits of a Japanese secret agent Tani Yutaka in Malaya during the World War II.

In 1950 and 1954, "Rasa Sayange" was used in the soundtracks of Indonesian films Darah dan Doa and Lewat Djam Malam directed by Usmar Ismail.

In 1953, Hamako Watanabe, accompanied with the Victor Orchestra, recorded a rendition of Rasa Sayange (Japanese: ラサ・サヤン・エ) alongside Terang Bulan (Japanese: トラン・ブーラン) in Japanese.

In a report from The Straits Times on August 20, 1958, The World Assembly of Youth (WAY) conference held in New Delhi has officially adopted the beloved Malayan folk song “Rasa Sayang” as its theme tune.

In 1959, a comedy film in Malay language titled Rasa Sayang Eh was produced by Cathay Keris in Singapore.

On April 1, 1959, "Rasa Sayang" was performed by Malay students from Malaya in Sydney during an exhibition held to raise funds for the United Nations International Children’s Emergency Fund (UNICEF), which was officiated by the wife of the Malayan High Commissioner, Datin Gunn Lay Teik.

In 1960, George de Fretes released an album titled Indonesian Classics No.1, it features a variety of Indonesian folk songs including "Rasa Sayange".

In 1960, the Hindi version of the song was used in the movie Singapore, sung by Lata Mangeshkar and Mohammed Rafi.

In 1962, the Lokananta Solo record company distributed LP records as souvenirs to the participants of the 4th Asian Games in 1962 held in Jakarta, the LP included several Indonesian folk songs including "Rasa Sayange".

In 1989, Singaporean singer-songwriter Dick Lee produced a rendition of the song while including patriotic descriptions of Singaporean culture.

== See also ==
- Dondang Sayang
- List of Indonesian folk songs
- Music of Indonesia
- Music of Malaysia
- Music of Singapore
- Pantun

== Bibliography ==
- Biran, Misbach Yusa (2009a). Sejarah Film 1900–1950: Bikin Film di Jawa [History of Film 1900–1950: Making Films in Java] (in Indonesian). Jakarta: Komunitas Bamboo working with the Jakarta Art Council. ISBN 978-979-3731-58-2.
