= Classical Malay literature =

Malay-language literature from the Malay world

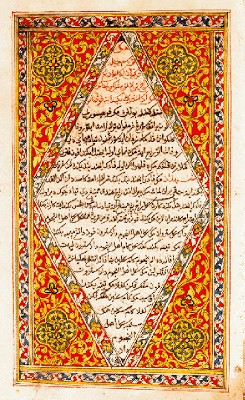
The frontispiece of a Jawi edition of the Malay Annals

Classical Malay literature, also known as traditional Malay literature, refers to the Malay-language literature from the Malay world, consisting of areas now part of Brunei, Singapore, Malaysia, and Indonesia; works from countries such as the Philippines and Sri Lanka have also been included. It shows considerable influences from Indian literature (such as in the tales of Ramayana and Mahabharata) as well as Arabic and Islamic literature (including tales of the Islamic prophet Muhammad and his companions). The term denotes a variety of works, including the hikayat, poetry (in two major forms, the syair and the pantun), history, and legal works.

== Selected works ==
- Syair Siti Zubaidah Perang Cina
- Syair Abdul Muluk
- Hikayat Hang Tuah
- Hikayat Amir Hamzah
- Sejarah Melayu
- Hikayat Bayan Budiman
- Hikayat Raja-raja Pasai
- Hikayat Banjar
- Hikayat Abdullah
- Undang-Undang Melaka

== Selected authors ==
- Abdullah bin Abdul Kadir
- Hamzah Fansuri
- Nuruddin ar-Raniri
- Raja Ali Haji
- Tun Sri Lanang

== See also ==
- Indonesian literature, for works considered part of the modern Indonesian literary canon
- Malaysian literature, for works considered part of the modern Malaysian literary canon
- List of Hikayat
