= List of Hikayat =

Hikayat (Jawi: حكاية; Gurmukhi: ਹਿਕਾਇਤਾ, romanized: Hikā'itā) is an Arabic word that literally translates to "stories" and is a form of Malay and Sikh literature. This article presents a list of hikayat from various time periods.

== Overview ==
=== Malay ===
Malay hikayats relate the adventures of heroes from kingdoms across the Malay Archipelago (spanning modern Indonesia and Malaysia, especially in Sumatra) or chronicles of their royalty. The stories they contain, though based on history, are heavily romanticized. Poetical format is not required in Malay and Arabic Hikayat while the Acehnese Hikayat requires it.

=== Sikh ===
Hikayats also appear in Sikh literature of the Indian subcontinent, of which 11 or 12 are associated with Guru Gobind Singh.

== 14th century ==
- Hikayat Bayan Budiman Bayan 1371 (MS 1852)
- Hikayat Raja-raja Pasai Pasai ±1390 (MS 1815)

== 15th century ==
- Hikayat Muhammad Hanafiah MH ±1450 (MSS <1624, <1682)
- Hikayat Amir Hamzah

== 16th century ==
- Hikayet Deva Mandu
- Hikayat Seri Rama Rama unknown (MS <1633) (A Ramayana translation into Malay)
- Hikayat Inderaputera Ind <1600 (MS 1600) (Hikayat Indraputra)
- Hikayat Iskandar Zulkarnain Isk <1600 (MS ±1830)
- Qasidah al-Burdah QB unknown (MS <1604)
- `Aqâ´id al-Nasafî AN 1590 (MS ditto)
- Syair Hamzah Fansuri HF late 16th century (MSS early 17th century - 1853)

== 17th century ==
- Spraek en Woord-Boek SWB 1603
- Taj al-Salatin (Dewan) TS.D 1603 (MS ±1775)
- Taj al-Salatin (Roorda) TS.R 1603
- Hikayat Aceh Aceh ±1625 (MS ±1675)
- Cerita Kutai Kutai 1625 (MS 1849)
- Bustan al-Salatin BS 1640 (MS >1807)
- Hujjat al-Siddîq HS 1641-1644 (MS 1772)
- Hikayat Tanah Hitu Hitu 1650 (MS <1662)
- Hikayat Ibrahim ibn Adham IbrA ±1650 (MS 1775)
- Hikayat Pelanduk Jenaka Pel unknown (MS ±1650)
- Sejarah Melayu SM ±1650 (MS 1808)
- Hikayat Banjar dan Kota Waringin Banj 1663 (MS 1810)
- Tarjumân al-Mustafîd TM 1642-1693 (MS ±1675)
- Bab Takzir BT ±1680 (MS <1753)
- Hikayat Ibrahim ibn Adham (short) IbrA.s 1689 (MS 1817)
- Raja Babi (1775)

== 18th century ==
- Asal Bangsa Jin & Dewa-Dewa ABJD ±1700 (MS 1855)
- Hikayat Hang Tuah Tuah 1700 (MS 1849)
- Hikayat Patani Pat 1730 (MS 1839)
- Surat al-Anbiya' Anb ±1750
- Syair Bidasari Bid ±1750 (MS 1825)
- Risalah Shihabuddin RS 1750s (MS 1823)
- Risalah fi 'l-Tawhid RT 1760s (MS 1783)
- Misa Melayu Misa ±1780 (MS 1836)
- Hikayat Nakhoda Muda Nakh 1788 (MS <1791)
- Hikaaitaan - Hikayats by Guru Gobind Singh (1704)

== 19th century ==
- Hikayat Perintah Negeri Benggala PNB 1811 (MS 1811)
- Syair Sultan Maulana Maul ±1815 (MS 1825)
- Syair Sinyor Kosta Kosta 1820
- Syair Raja Tedung dengan Raja Katak T&K unknown (MS ±1865)
- Hikayat Merong Mahawangsa MW ±1821 (MS 1898)
- Surat Keterangan Syeikh Jalaluddin SJal >1821 (MS <1829)
- Silsilah Perak Perak ±1826
- Syair Kerajaan Bima Bima ±1830 (MS 1857)
- Syair Dagang Berjual-Beli DBB 1831
- Syair Potong Gaji PG 1831
- Syair Tengku Perbu Perb 1835
- Hikayat Panca Tanderan 1835
- Kisah Pelayaran Abdullah ke Kelantan 1838
- Civil War in Kelantan Kel 1839
- Hikayat Marakarma (Si Miskin) Misk unknown (MS 1855)
- Ceretera2 karangan Abdullah Abd.C 1843,1851
- Hikayat Abdullah 1843
- Syair2 karangan Abdullah Abd.S 1828-1848
- Syair Engku Puteri EPut 1844
- Hikayat Maharaja Marakarma Mar 1844 or 1848
- Syair Perang Johor PJ 1844
- Hikayat Iblis Iblis 1846
- Syair Kunjungan Tengku Selangor KTS <1860
- Warnasarie Ws 1852
- Kisah Pelayaran Abdullah ke Mekah 1854
- Mukhtasar Tawarikh al-Wustha TW 1854
- Hikayat Siak Siak 1855 (MS 1893)
- Syair Kumbang Mengindera Kumb <1859
- Surat kepada Von de Wall VdW 1856-1872
- Syair Bayan Budiman BayB ±1860
- Syair Kumbang dan Melati K&M <1866
- Syair Bunga Air Mawar Mwr <1866
- Syair Nuri dengan Simbangan Nuri ±1860
- Syair Nyamuk dan Lalat Nymk ±1860
- Syair Saudagar Bodoh SBod 1861
- Hikayat Raja Damsyik Dmsy.H 1863
- Syair Raja Damsyik Dmsy.S 1864
- Syair Kiamat Kmt unknown (MS 1865)
- Salasilah Melayu dan Bugis M&B 1865
- Tuhfat al-Nafis TN 1866 (MS 1890)
- Syair Awai Awai 1868
- Syair Bunga-Bungaan Bunga ±1870
- Syair Burung Pungguk Pung ±1870
- Syair Unggas Soal Jawab Ungg 1871
- Syair Sang Kupu-Kupu Kupu ? 1870s
- Kitab Suci KS 1879 (PL), 1935 (PB)
- Raja Inggeris Jubili RIJ 1887
- Ucapan Kwin Jubili UKJ 1887 (edition 1891) PB 1889-1938
- Muhimmat al-Nafa´is MN 1892
- Syair Perjalanan Sultan Lingga PSL 1894
- Al-Imam Imam 1906-1908
- Syair Raksi Raksi unknown (MS 1915)
- Majalah Guru MG 1930-1935
- Saudara S 1930-1935
- Warta Malaya WM 1931-1935
- Majlis M 1932-1935

== Miscellaneous ==
- Hikayat Mara Karma
- Hikayat Gul Bakawali
- Hikayat Perang Sabil (Hikayat Prang Sabi)
- Hikayat Raja Baday
- Hikayat Éseutamu

The original Jawi script Acehnese language work Hikayat Perang Sabil (Hikayat Prang Sabi) has been transliterated into the Latin alphabet and annotated by Ibrahim Alfian (Teuku.) published in Jakarta. Perang sabi was the Acehnese word for jihad, a holy war and Acehnese language literary works on perang sabi were distributed by Islamic clerics ('ulama) such as Teungku di Tiro to help the resistance against the Dutch in the Aceh War. The recompense awarded by in paradise detailed in Islamic Arabic texts and Dutch atrocities were expounded on in the Hikayat Perang Sabil which was communally read by small cabals of Ulama and Acehnese who swore an oath before going to achieve the desired status of "martyr" by launching suicide attacks on the Dutch. Perang sabil was the Malay equivalent to other terms like Jihad, Ghazawat for "Holy war", the text was also spelled "Hikayat perang sabi". Fiction novels like Sayf Muhammad Isa's Sabil: Prahara di Bumi Rencong on the war by Aceh against the Dutch include references ro Hikayat Perang Sabil. Mualimbunsu Syam Muhammad wrote the work called "Motives for Perang Sabil in Nusantara", Motivasi perang sabil di Nusantara: kajian kitab Ramalan Joyoboyo, Dalailul-Khairat, dan Hikayat Perang Sabil on Indonesia's history of Islamic holy war (Jihad). Children and women were inspired to do suicide attacks by the Hikayat Perang Sabil against the Dutch. Hikayat Perang Sabil is also known as "Hikayat Prang Sabi". Hikayat Perang Sabil is considered as part of 19th century Malay literature. In Dutch occupied Aceh, Hikayat Perang Sabil was confiscated from Sabi's house during a Police raid on September 27, 1917.

== See also ==
- Hikaaitaan
