= Iskandar Zulkarnain =

Iskandar Zulkarnain may refer to:

- Theories about Alexander the Great in the Quran, Alexander the Great (Iskandar in Arabic) as traditionally identified with the Quranic figure Dhu'l-Qarnayn (or Zulkarnain)
- Hikayat Iskandar Zulkarnain, Malay epic poem about Alexander the Great
- Iskandar Zulkarnain Zainuddin (born 1991), Malaysian badminton player
