= Kisah Pelayaran Abdullah ke Kelantan =

Malay literary text

Kisah Pelayaran Abdullah ke Kelantan (Jawi: قصه ڤلايران عبدالله ك كلنتن; English: The story of Abdullah’s voyage to Kelantan) is a Malay literary work of Abdullah bin Abdul Kadir. It was first published in 1838 in Singapore, and considered as the first Malay literary text being published commercially.

== Contents ==
The work recounts Abdullah’s voyage from Singapore to Kelantan with his companions, Grandpre and Baba Ko An to submit a letter from Sir George Bonham, Governor of Straits Settlements to Sultan of Kelantan. His writing includes his experiences during his stops in Pahang and Terengganu as well as what he experienced in Kelantan. This work also contains his advice to Malay rulers and comparisons he made between the British system of governing with that of Malay rulers.

== Publications ==
The first edition of the story was written both in Latin and Jawi, while the second edition (1852) was printed only in Jawi script. In 1855 the Dutch scholar J. Pijnappel later published special editions for students of Malay language. All these editions became references to H.C. Klinkert for his own edition intended for students in Dutch East Indies.

A translation into English was made by A.E. Cooper and published in 1949 by the Malaya Publishing House, Singapore.

In Malaysia, the story was re-published in 1960 by the editor Kassim Ahmad. In 2005, it was edited by Amin Sweeney and published as part of a collection of complete works of Abdullah bin Abdul Kadir.

In 2022, this work was published by Legasi Pemikir - LEKIR, with transliteration by Saufy Jauhary.
