= Zafarnama (letter) =

Verse letter from Guru Gobind Singh Sahib to Aurangzeb Mughal Emperor in India

Zafarnamah ਜ਼ਫ਼ਰਨਾਮਾ ظفرنامه
- by Guru Gobind Singh
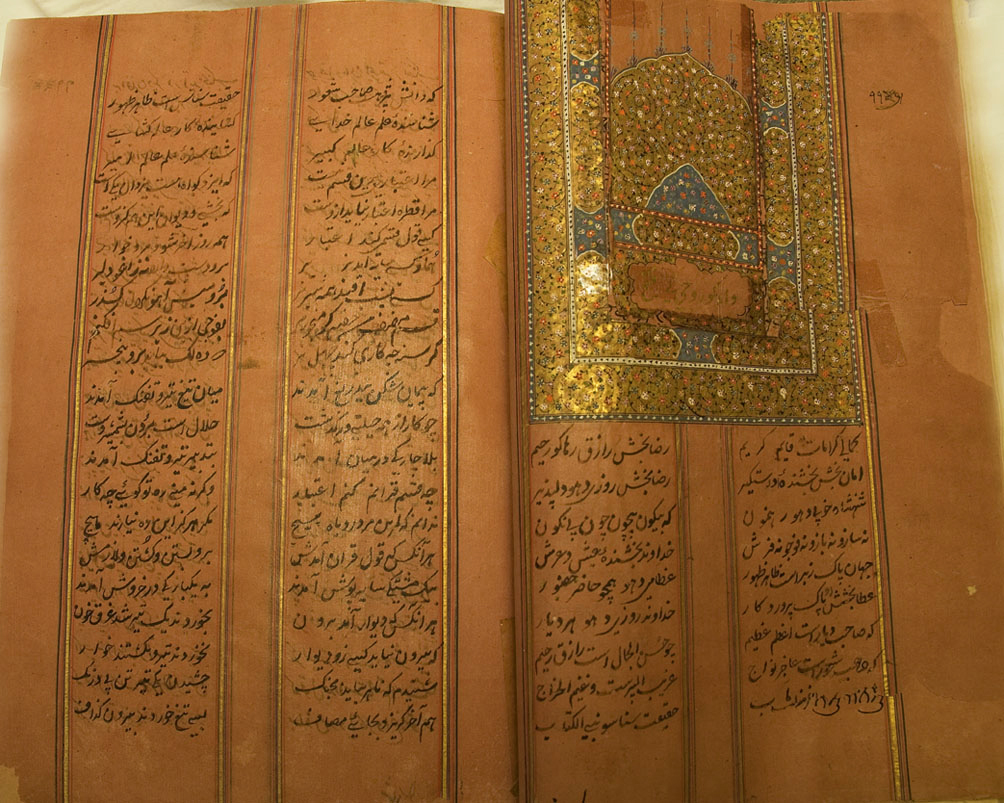
- Folios of the copy prepared by Bhai Daya Singh of the original work
- Original title: Zafarnāmāh
- Written: 1705
- Country: Mughal Empire (present day India)
- Language: Persian
- Subject(s): War, religion, morality, and justice
- Genre(s): Religion, Letter
- Meter: Chantt
- Lines: 111 verses
- Preceded by: Charitropakhyan
- Followed by: Hikayats

The Zafarnāma (Gurmukhi: ਜ਼ਫ਼ਰਨਾਮਾ; Persian: ظفرنامہ, romanized: Zafarnameh, lit. 'Epistle of Victory') was a spiritual victory letter sent by Guru Gobind Singh in 1705 to the Mughal Emperor of India, Aurangzeb, after the Battle of Chamkaur.

== Background ==
In the aftermath of the Battle of Chamkaur, the Guru wanted to write a letter of condemnation to the Mughal emperor for breaking his oath swore upon the Quran by attacking the Sikhs who were evacuating the fort of Anandpur after a long siege when they were promised safe passage by Aurangzeb. The Guru did not rely upon the Mughal couriers to deliver the letter as he did not trust them to do so and he wanted to know how the emperor would react to its contents so he decided to send Daya Singh and Dharam Singh to deliver the letter personally. Daya Singh had previously delivered a letter from the Guru addressed to the emperor from Ghulal on 26 December 1704. Guru Gobind Singh sent 5 Singhs including Daya Singh, Dharam Singh and Sambhal Singh with the help of Naib Subedar Haji Sardar Shah to deliver the Zafarnama to Emperor Aurangzeb in Ahmednagar on 5 January 1707, the last day of Ramadaan that year.

The letter was written at Kangar village in modern-day Bathinda district and dispatched from the same place, or from the nearby village of Dina in modern-day Moga district. According to Sikh tradition, the village of Dina located near the district's border with the neighbouring Bathinda district is where Guru Gobind Singh rested for a few days after the Second Battle of Chamkaur. Scholar Louis E. Fenech states the Guru rested at Dina at the house (specifically an upper story room called a chubārā) of a local Sikh named Bhai Desu Tarkhan after sending the Zafarnama from Kangar village, entrusted in the hands of Bhai Dharam Singh and Bhai Daya Singh. A gurdwara, Zafarnama Gurdwara Lohgarh Sahib Pind Dina Patishahi Dasvin, commemorates his stay at Dina, Moga, and a sign there claims the Guru stayed at the location for 3 months and 13 days. Harbans Singh in The Encyclopedia of Sikhism states the Guru only stayed at Dina for a few days conversely to the claims of the Gurdwara. He further states that he stayed with two local Sikhs named Chaudhry Shamir and Lakhmir, the grandsons of a local chieftain named Rai Jodh, whom had served the sixth Sikh guru, Hargobind, and fought and died at the Battle of Mehraj. Guru Gobind Singh gathered an army of hundreds of locals from Dina and the surrounding area and continued on his journey.

== Content ==
Christopher Shackle divides the work into five parts:

1. the invocation of God
2. the loss of Anandpur
3. the battle of Chamkaur
4. the address to Aurangzeb
5. the conclusion

In this letter, Guru Gobind Singh reminds Aurangzeb how he and his soldiers had broken their oaths sworn upon the Qur'an, when they promised safe passage to the Guru but launched a hidden attack of an army described as much larger, on forty famished Sikh soldiers. He tells Aurangzeb this was not a battle, it was a slaughter. As such, in spite of losing most of his Sikhs in this attack, he had won a moral victory over the Emperor who had broken his vows to Allah. He also states that despite sending a huge army to capture or kill the Guru, the Mughal forces did not succeed in their mission.

In the 111 verses of this notice, Guru Gobind Singh rebukes Aurangzeb for his weaknesses as a human being and for his lack of morality as a leader. Guru Gobind Singh also confirms his confidence and his unflinching faith in the Almighty even after suffering extreme personal loss of his father, mother, all four of his sons, and many fellow Sikhs to Aurangzeb's tyranny. Guru Gobind Singh then invites Aurangzeb to meet him in Kangar village near Bathinda (Punjab) and assures him the Brar tribe will not harm him (Aurangzeb) as they are under his command.

نه ذره دریم راه خطرہ توراست
همه قومی بیرار هوکمی مراست

Translation:

On the way there will be no danger to your life,
for, the whole tribe of Brars accepts my command.

— Guru Gobind Singh, Zafarnama, verse 59

Of the 111 or 112 verses, the maximum numbers of 34 verses are to praise God; 32 deal with Aurangzeb’s invitation for the Guru to meet him and the Guru's refusal to meet the Emperor – instead the Guru asks Aurangzeb to visit him; 24 verses detail the events in the Battle of Chamkaur, which took place on 22 December 1704; 15 verses reprove Aurangzeb for breaking promise given by him and by his agents to the Guru; In verses 78 and 79, Guru Gobind Singh had also warned Aurangzeb about the resolve of the Khalsa not to rest till the Mughal Empire is destroyed; 6 verses praise Aurangzeb.

In the work, the criteria for invoking dharamyudh is listed:

چو کار از همه حیلتی در گسست
حلالست بردن بشمشیر دست

Translation:

All modes of redressing the wrong having failed,
raising of sword is pious and just.

— Guru Gobind Singh, Zafarnama, verse 22

The original Persian line, which has several translations, is borrowed almost word-for-word from Saadi's works which were popular across the Persian-speaking Islamic world, specifically the first chapter of Bustan (a chapter which deals with "how to treat a tyrant who strikes fear in the hearts of the pure") and the eighth chapter of Gulistan, with the replacement of دست (hand; figuratively: trick) with کار (deed; figuratively: strategy). It serves as a recontextualization of a popular work which would be familiar to Aurangzeb, with the purpose of undercutting Aurangzeb's authority by using ideas from his favorite works of literature against him. This line was later appropriated by Lahore Singh Sabha intellectuals, unaware of the connection to Saadi, as a summary of the Sikh ideals of miri piri and dharam yuddh.

Another notable verse of Zafarnama references Guru Gobind Singh's own battles against the kings of the Sivalik Hills who allied with the Mughals after the ratification of the Khalsa:

منم کوشته ام کهیان بوتپرست
که و بوتپرستند و من بوتشیکن

Translation:

I am also the annihilator of the hill rajas, the idol worshippers.
They are idol worshippers and I am the idol breaker.

— Guru Gobind Singh, Zafarnama, verse 95

The work is sometimes considered to be the first of the Hikayats, with the remaining 11 works following it in the Dasam Granth.

== Language ==
The letter is written in Persian. However, in one recension there are four verses in Braj. It was originally written in the Perso-Arabic script rather than in Gurmukhi. The version currently in circulation found in the Dasam Granth, the compilation of Guru Gobind Singh’s poetry, is in Gurmukhi script and Persian verse. Copies printed and sold today are usually in Gurmukhi script.

== Manuscripts ==
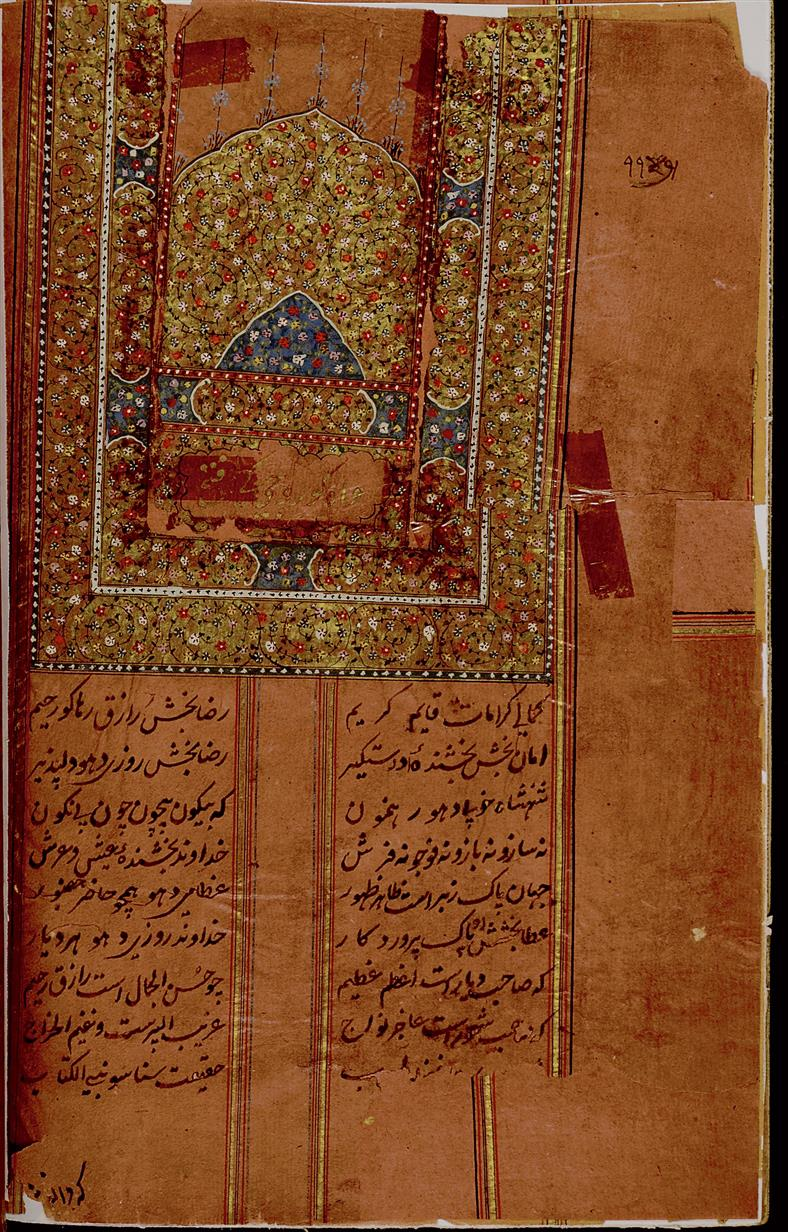
Opening folio of a copy prepared by Bhai Daya Singh (one of the inaugural/original quintet of Panj Piare) of Guru Gobind Singh's Zafarnama composition. Digitized by Panjab Digital Library.

A still-extant copy of the original document is said to have been prepared by Bhai Daya Singh.

== Authenticity ==
Academics Anil Chander Banerjee and Christopher Shackle believe the extant work is not the authentic one as originally written by Guru Gobind Singh. According to Banerjee, the current text is unsuited for political correspondence and the original letter may have been written in prose which was later transformed into a poetic piece, which is the present composition that has been handed down. A similar position was held by Shackle, who thought the original work was in prose but was later rewritten in a poetic style, emulated upon the epic metres of the Ferdowsi's Shahnama, effectively borrowing elements of Islamicate literature to have a more powerful effect of undercutting the "moral authority" of the recipient, Aurangzeb, a devout Muslim. One view is that the original prose of the authentic letter by the Guru was transformed into poetry by Bhai Nand Lal, but Banerjee finds holes in this theory as the text is incorporated as part of the Dasam Granth, presented as the Guru's writings alongside other works of his.

The Zafarnama is similar to the Fatehnama, another purported work ascribed to the tenth Guru. The Fatehnama survives as a work of complete couplets and one incomplete couplet.

== Translations ==
English translations are as follows, done by Navtej Sarna and Harpreet Singh:

- Singh, Gobind (2011). Zafarnama: Guru Gobind Singh (PDF). Translated by Sarna, Navtej. Penguin Books. ISBN 9780143425557 – via Academy of the Punjab in North America.
- Singh, Harpreet (2027). The Zafarnama of Guru Gobind Singh. Cambridge: Harvard University Press. ISBN 9780674308114.

The work has also been translated into Punjabi.

== See also ==
- Sikh scriptures
- Guru Granth Sahib
