= Sri Charitropakhyan =

Sikh composition

- Dasam Granth
- ← Shastar Nam Mala Zafarnama →
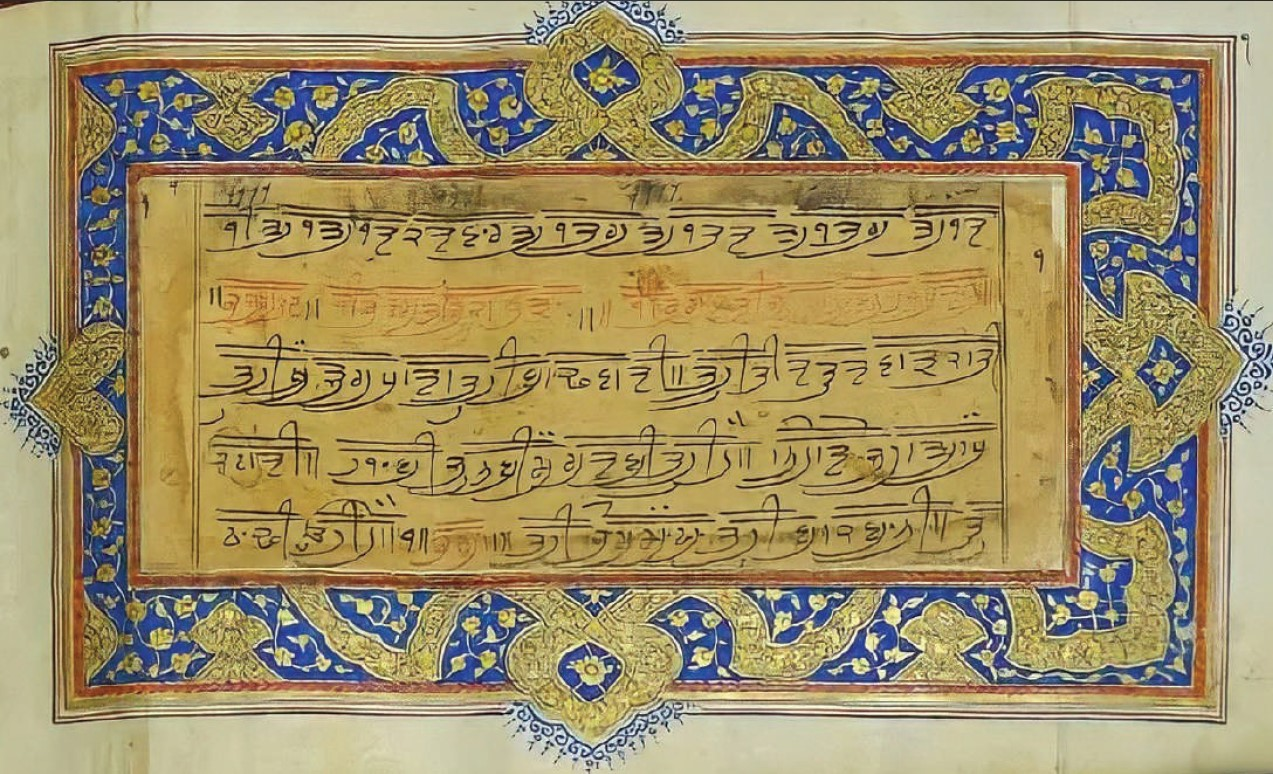
- Invocation of the Charitropakhyan, Stanza 1-2, in the penmenship of Guru Gobind Singh

Information
- Religion: Sikhism
- Author: Guru Gobind Singh
- Chapters: 404
- Verses: 7558 or 7569

Sri Charitropakhyan or Pakhyan Charitar and also Tria Charitra (Punjabi: ਪਖ੍ਯਾਨ ਚਰਿਤ੍ਰ, also known as ਸ਼੍ਰੀ ਚਰਿਤ੍ਰੋਪਾਖ੍ਯਾਨ and ਤ੍ਰਿਯਾ ਚਰਿਤ੍ਰ) is a huge composition of short stories, with the purpose of learning from others' mistakes to acquire more refined judgement in all fields, present in Dasam Granth, which is generally and traditionally ascribed to Guru Gobind Singh. The composition contains 405/404 tales or episodes of wiles of men and women, containing many historical, mythological and philosophical aspects, having 7558 verses. This composition ends at Chopai which is one of the Nitnem banis. The term Charitropakhyan is derived from two words, Charitar means characteristics/function of character and Pakhyan means already told. There are two types of Charitars, Purakh Charitar (male characters) and Tria Chariter (female characters).

There is dispute over the authorship of Charitropakhyan among scholars, with some claiming that it is out of tune with other Sikh scriptures, and thus must have been composed by other poets. Vir Singh (writer) believed these stories to be written by Guru Gobind Singh and that these stories "are meant for the sharpness of the intellect and to evoke the passion of the warrior spirit." and that the romantic tales can also be understood allegorically. As per the Guru Kian Sakhian and internal evidence, the writing of the work began in 1691 and was completed in 1696.

== Plot ==
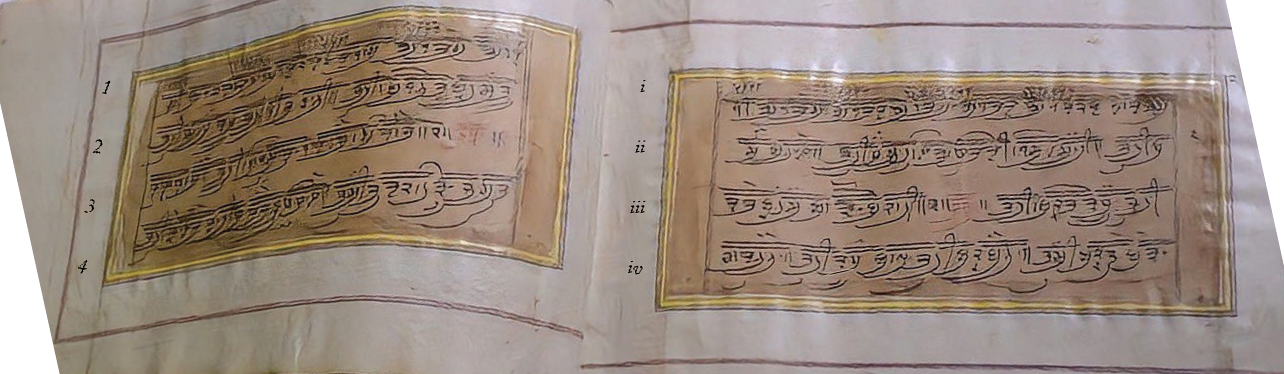
A photo of the Charitropakhyan Pothi (volume of pages) in the hand of Guru Gobind Singh

In a literal sense, Charitropakhyan is a plot created by the author in which there is a frame story which has the wise minister narrating stories to his King (ਮੰਤ੍ਰੀ ਭੂਪ ਸੰਬਾਦੇ). The plot is explained in the second tale, which is as follows:

King Chitra Singh of Chitravati married a damsel of Indra's kingdom. She gave birth to a son, Hanuvant Singh. The damsel deserted the king when he grew old. He ordered all of his employees to find her, but instead found another similar looking girl named Chitramati. Chitramati was the daughter of the ruler of Orissa. To marry her, he had a fight with her father, the ruler of Orissa. Chitramati was about the age of the son of Chitra Singh, Hanuvant Singh. She grew heavily attracted to him and tried to seduce him into a sexual relationship, but Hanuvant Singh was religious in thought and did not go for incest. She in turn created a drama and accused Hanuvant Singh of raping her. King Chitra Singh believed her blindly, without knowing the side of his son, and sentenced him to death.

Mantri, the wise adviser of the King, knew that the King's second wife, Chitramati, was not of a pious character and was falsely blaming Hanuvant Singh. In order to prevent the wrongful execution of Hanuvant Singh, the adviser shared various accounts of stories depicting different situations, with the intention of making the King realize his folly and improve his decision-making skill.

== List of tales ==
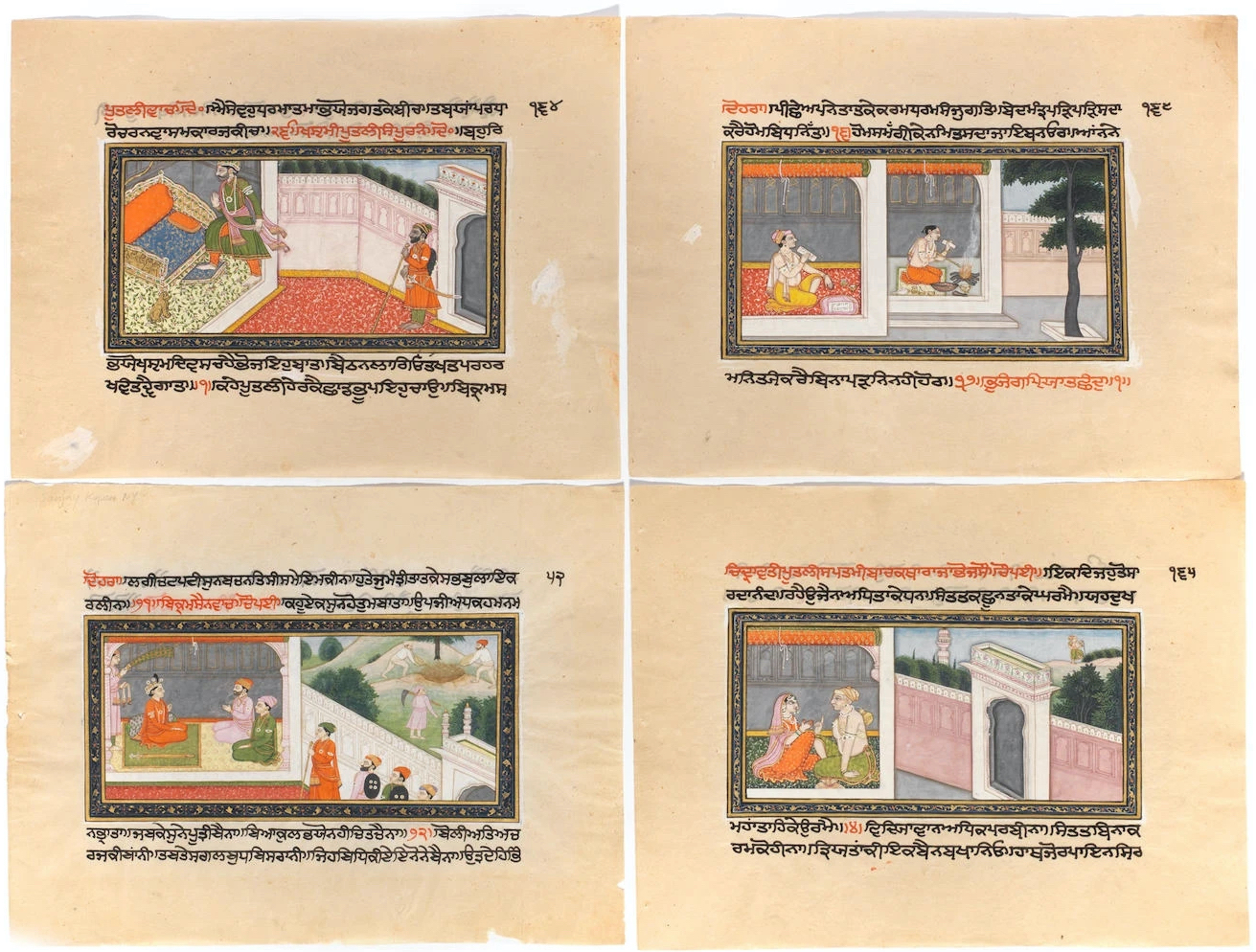
Four illustrated leaves from a dispersed manuscript, ca.1850

Following is the list of tales present in Sri Charitropakhyan:

1. Chandi Charitar - The tale of Shakti (Hukam)
2. Raja Chitar Singh and Rani Chitar Vati (Frame story)
3. Tale of Girl of Kalpi Town
4. Tale of Ghurki
5. Tale of Sehaj Kala
6. Tale of Maal Mati
7. Tale of Zainabadi
8. Tale of Anuraag Mati
9. Tale of Jag Jot Mati
10. Tale of Chitarkala
11. Tale of Wife of a Shopkeeper
12. Tale of Radhika
13. Tale of Wife of Ramdas
14. Tale of Puhap Mati
15. Tale of Bhaanmati
16. Tale of Chhajia
17. Tale of Bitan Mati
18. Tale of Chhalchhider Kumari
19. Tale of Naadira Bano
20. Tale of Lal Mati
21. Tale of Anoop Kaur
22. Tale of Anoop Kaur
23. Tale of Anoop Kaur
24. Tale of Sumer Kaur
25. Tale of Prem Kumari
26. Tale of Nirat Mati
27. Tale of Biyom Kala
28. Tale of Soorchhat
29. Tale of Madan Mati
30. Tale of Chaachar Mati
31. Tale of Maan Manjri
32. Tale of Ras Manjri
33. Tale of Chhattar Manjri
34. Tale of Chhab Maan Mati
35. Tale of King of South
36. Tale of Fateh Mati
37. Tale of Gainde Khan
38. Tale of Raj Mati
39. Tale of Raj Mati
40. Tale of Diljan Mati
41. Tale of Preet Manjri
42. Tale of Rustam Kala
43. Tale of A Slave
44. Tale of Tilik Manjri
45. Tale of Raj Mati
46. Tale of Noor Bibi
47. Tale of Baadal Kumari
48. Tale of Noor Jehan
49. Tale of Nand Mati
50. Tale of Pohap Manjri
51. Tale of Sheel Manjari
52. Tale of Daughter of Raja Vijay Singh
53. Tale of Vijay Kunwar
54. Tale of Baal Mati
55. Tale of Roop Mati
56. Tale of Chandra Kala
57. Tale of Inder Mati
58. Tale of Chiter Devi
59. Tale of Laadam Kunwar and Suhaag Devi
60. Tale of Rang Raae
61. Tale of Shah
62. Tale of Mahaan Singh
63. Tale of Rani of Raja Parbal Singh
64. Tale of Dam Prabha
65. Tale of Wife of Mittar Singh
66. Tale of Roshan Raae
67. Tale of Roop Kala
68. Tale of Son of a Shah
69. Tale of Raj Kala
70. Tale of Chattar Prabha
71. Tale of King of Sirmaur
72. Tale of Shah of Gujarat
73. Tale of Pohap Wati
74. Tale of Bairam Thief
75. Tale of Indebted Thief
76. Tale of Son-in-Law Thief
77. Tale of Bhagwati
78. Tale of Gigo
79. Tale of Bisva Mati
80. Tale of Radha
81. Tale of Drig Daniya
82. Tale of Begum of Shah Jehan
83. Tale of Rajo
84. Tale of lndra Mati
85. Tale of Raja Uchsrav
86. Tale of lnder Singh
87. Tale of Chandra Prabha
88. Tale of Kanj Prabha
89. Tale of Ram Singh Jat
90. Tale of Deepkala
91. Tale of Kaamkandla
92. Tale of Saroop Kala
93. Tale of A Weaver 186
94. Tale of Din Diaal
95. Tale of Bindo
96. Tale of Gohraan Raae
97. Tale of Raja Rasaloo and Rani Kokila
98. Tale of Heer Ranjha
99. Tale of Ruder Kala
100. Tale of A Clever Woman
101. Tale of Sohni Mahiwal
102. Tale of Raja Dasrath and Kaikaee
103. Tale of Shah Jallaal
104. Tale of The Wife of a Jat
105. Tale of Taas Beg
106. Tale of Four Thieves
107. Tale of Maan Kunwar
108. Tale of Sassi Punnu
109. Tale of Urvassi
110. Tale of Raja Roopeshwar
111. Tale of Raj Prabha
112. Tale of Chatar Kala
113. Tale of ani Krishna Kunwar
114. Tale of Sringi Rishi and Prostitute
115. Tale of Rishi Gautam and Ahliya
116. Tale of Two Devils: Sandh and Apsandh
117. Tale of Sachee
118. Tale of Rani Mantar Kala
119. Tale of Rani Ruder Kala
120. Tale of Vishnu
121. Tale of A Thief Woman
122. Tale of Rani Kookum Devi and Ghansaar Devi
123. Tale of Lord Vishnu
124. Tale of Rani Phool Mati
125. Tale of Indra Mati
126. Tale of A Brave Woman
127. Tale of Rattan Singh
128. Tale of Rani Maan Mati
129. Tale of Mirza Sahiban
130. Tale of Sumat Kumari
131. Tale of Bhaag Mati
132. Tale of Sughar Kumari
133. Tale of Sujjan Kumari
134. Tale of Baaj Mati
135. Tale of Kala Kunwar
136. Tale of Rani Bharmar Mati
137. Tale of Daropdee Arjan
138. Tale of Rani Abhawatti
139. Tale of Maaneshawari
140. Tale of Megh Mati
141. Tale of Paarbati
142. Tale of Rajkumari Ukha
143. Tale of Rani Raj Mati
144. Tale of Shingarwati
145. Tale of Bhaagwati
146. Tale of Parmod Kumari
147. Tale of Rani Khairy and Samin
148. Tale of Rani of Raja Durga Dutt
149. Tale of Five Wives of a Drug-Addict
150. Tale of Rani Garbhwati
151. Tale of Gumaan Mati
152. Tale of Lachhmi
153. Tale of Naaz Mati
154. Tale of Darapkala
155. Tale of Praan Mati
156. Tale of Kandarapkala
157. Tale of Nal Damwanti
158. Tale of Rani Taanbar Kala
159. Tale of Rani Bir Kala
160. Tale of Maid Krishna Kala
161. Tale of Sanmas Dhola
162. Tale of Tund Kala
163. Tale of Vijay Kumari
164. Tale of Udhaypuri Begum
165. Tale of Bhistkala
166. Tale of Rani Joban Kala
167. Tale of Rani Shaahparee
168. Tale of Rani Jot Mati
169. Tale of Milkmaid Shaahparee
170. Tale of Rani Bir Kala
171. Tale of Sahib Devi
172. Tale of Geet Kala
173. Tale of Sangeeta Kala
174. Tale of Surta Devi
175. Tale of Chapal Kala
176. Tale of Bir Mati
177. Tale of Menlata
178. Tale of Sumer Devi
179. Tale of Kaamwati
180. Tale of ainotma
181. Tale of Rani Nisis Prabha
182. Tale of Bhaan Kala
183. Tale of Rit Raj Prabha
184. Tale of Daropdhi
185. Tale of Runrang Kumari
186. Tale of Achalkala
187. Tale of Kaamkala
188. Tale of Kanchan Prabha
189. Tale of Bhoop Kala
190. Tale of Chanchala
191. Tale of Parbeen Rai
192. Tale of Gaan Kala
193. Tale of Tirdas Kala
194. Tale of Wife of a Basket Weaver
195. Tale of Maanmati and Bipan Prabha
196. Tale of Apritam Kala
197. Tale of Ran Rang Mati
198. Tale of Sankh Kunwar
199. Tale of Rani Padmini
200. Tale of Rani Udginder Prabha
201. Tale of Yousaf Zulaikhan
202. Tale of Chapal Kala
203. Tale of Raja Narkasur
204. Tale of Rani Kailaas Mati
205. Tale of Vijay Kumari
206. Tale of Rani Ishaq Mati
207. Tale of Rani Mushak Mati
208. Tale of Atpal Devi
209. Tale of Bharthari
210. Tale of Rani Chanchala Kumari
211. Tale of Tarita Prabha
212. Tale of Sukmaar Mati
213. Tale of Mrig Nainee
214. Tale of Gulzaar Mati
215. Tale of Tarun Kumari
216. Tale of Rani Katach Kumari
217. Tale of Shah Sikander
218. Tale of Rani Dinket Mati
219. Tale of Chaplaang Mati
220. Tale of Roshan Jehan
221. Tale of Mrig Raj Mati
222. Tale of Rani Bhog Mati
223. Tale of Rani Chhattarmati
224. Tale of Rani Tripuraar Kala
225. Tale of Rani Chakhchar Mati
226. Tale of Rustam Devi
227. Tale of Rani Manmaal Mati
228. Tale of Rani Biraj Mati
229. Tale of Budh Mati
230. Tale of Madan Mati
231. Tale of Main Kala
232. Tale of Bad Diachhmati
233. Tale of Bichhan Mati
234. Tale of Nirpat Kala
235. Tale of Rani Achhal Mati
236. Tale of A Prostitute
237. Tale of Bhog Mati
238. Tale of Chhat Chhail Kumari
239. Tale of Beer Mati
240. Tale of Ruch Raaj Kumari
241. Tale of Rani Birha Manjri
242. Tale of Chhab Maan Manjri
243. Tale of Chitar Manjri
244. Tale of Naagar Mati
245. Tale of Ras Tilak Manjri
246. Tale of Swaran Manjri
247. Tale of Jas Tilak Manjri
248. Tale of Amit Prabha
249. Tale of Bichchhan Manjri
250. Tale of Bhujang Mati
251. Tale of Jal Jaachh
252. Tale of Sukh Mati
253. Tale of Jeeo Mati
254. Tale of Bishan Mati
255. Tale of Lahore Mati
256. Tale of Seven Maidens
257. Tale of Aligunj Mati
258. Tale of Hans Mati
259. Tale of Mrigraj Kala
260. Tale of Kajraachh Mati
261. Tale of Mashook Mati
262. Tale of Mashook Mati
263. Tale of Naagar Mati
264. Tale of Birah Kumari
265. Tale of Prakrit Mati
266. Tale of Rann Khamb Kala
267. Tale of A Muslim Woman
268. Tale of Champa Kala
269. Tale of Jhakhket Mati
270. Tale of Poorab Devi
271. Tale of Bilaas Devi
272. Tale of Sugandh Mati
273. Tale of Sukrit Manjri
274. Tale of A Maid
275. Tale of Habsh Mati
276. Tale of Ruder Mati
277. Tale of A Co-Wife
278. Tale of Roshan Aara
279. Tale of Prem Manjri
280. Tale of Jugraaj Manjri
281. Tale of Rani Vijay Mati
282. Tale of Amar Kala
283. Tale of Rani Kinnar Mati
284. Tale of Dakhshan Devi
285. Tale of Sumat Mati
286. Tale of Bikhiya
287. Tale of Mariam Begum
288. Tale of Chhail Devi
289. Tale of Dakhshan Devi
290. Tale of Poorab Devi
291. Tale of Paschim Devi
292. Tale of Utter Mati
293. Tale of Raj Devi
294. Tale of Anand Wati
295. Tale of Chanchala Devi
296. Tale of Mangla Devi
297. Tale of Sakuch Mati
298. Tale of Jhilmil Devi
299. Tale of Achhal Devi
300. Tale of A Wise Friend
301. Tale of Isht Mati
302. Tale of Chhattar Devi
303. Tale of Abharn Devi
304. Tale of Vidhiya Mati
305. Tale of Tripur Mati
306. Tale of Dudamb Devi
307. Tale of Sughna Wati
308. Tale of Phut Basir Devi
309. Tale of Apoorab Devi
310. Tale of Ras Tilak Devi
311. Tale of Daughter of Shah
312. Tale of A Jatti
313. Tale of A Beautician
314. Tale of Sukmaar Devi
315. Tale of Pachham Devi
316. Tale of Bang Devi
317. Tale of Puhap Prabha
318. Tale of Margaj Devi
319. Tale of Muni Raj Mati
320. Tale of Rukmani
321. Tale of Devjaani
322. Tale of Makrachh Mati
323. Tale of Parmud Sen
324. Tale of Apsra Mati
325. Tale of Sultan Kumari (debated, missing charitar)
326. Tale of Sukch Mati
327. Tale of Achla Mati
328. Tale of Pir Kutab Shah
329. Tale of a Female (Water-Carrier)
330. Tale of Birah Devi
331. Tale of Valan Devi
332. Tale of Preet Kala
333. Tale of Daughter of Shah
334. Tale of Pingal Devi
335. Tale of Roshan Dimaagh
336. Tale of Rangh Jhar Devi
337. Tale of Parj Mati
338. Tale of Bivaas Mati
339. Tale of Rattan Mati
340. Tale of Mathura
341. Tale of Apachhara Devi
342. Tale of Baranga Devi
343. Tale of Sorath Devi and Paraj Kumari
344. Tale of Ras Rang Mati
345. Tale of Angana Devi
346. Tale of Gajgaah Mati
347. Tale of Lakhshmani
348. Tale of Gora Devi
349. Tale of Ugar Devi
350. Tale of Navjoban Devi
351. Tale of Bastar Mati
352. Tale of Zebatul Nisa
353. Tale of Rann Jhoomak Devi
354. Tale of Sandhla Devi
355. Tale of Bilaas Devi
356. Tale of Dal Bhanbah Devi
357. Tale of Khanjan Devi
358. Tale of Sunder Devi
359. Tale of Manmohan Devi
360. Tale of Jhakhjhoomer Devi
361. Tale of Gaj Gaamni Devi
362. Tale of Guloo
363. Tale of Punjab Devi
364. Tale of Mehtab Prabha
365. Tale of Chit Chop Mati
366. Tale of Naabh Mati
367. Tale of Moorakh Mati
368. Tale of Chakh Chaar Mati
369. Tale of Chanchal Devi
370. Tale of Abdaal Mati
371. Tale of Kanchan Devi
372. Tale of Rani Suchhab Wati
373. Tale of Hingla Devi
374. Tale of Mehtaab Mati
375. Tale of Jag Joban Devi
376. Tale of Parbin Devi
377. Tale of Suhaas Devi
378. Tale of Miradhaas Mati
379. Tale of Suprabha Devi
380. Tale of Chriter Mati
381. Tale of Khaadma Baano
382. Tale of Mani Neel Mati
383. Tale of Kokila Mati
384. Tale of Wife of Shah
385. Tale of Raj Kumari
386. Tale of Din Dipak Devi
387. Tale of Jagmohan Devi
388. Tale of Madh Mokal Devi
389. Tale of Makardhuj Devi
390. Tale of Gohra Rai
391. Tale of Khatima Baano
392. Tale of Sandal Devi
393. Tale of Champa Devi
394. Tale of Alkesh Mati
395. Tale of Sajul Devi
396. Tale of Chapla Devi
397. Tale of Sagar Devi
398. Tale of Alkrit Devi
399. Tale of Bhookhan Devi
400. Tale of Maha Kunwar
401. Tale of Basant Kumari
402. Tale of Sadda Kumari
403. Tale of Shiv Devi
404. Tale of Shri Immortal Lord (Chaupai Sahib)

== Summary of tales ==
The following are the summaries of several tales, translated from the work of Dr Rattan Singh Jaggi Steek of the Dasam Granth

=== 98. Tale of Heer Ranjha ===
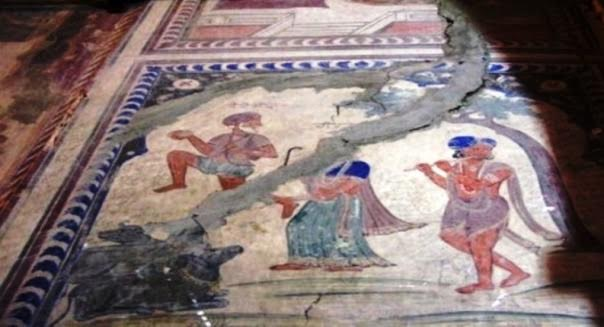
Fresco artwork of Heer and Ranjha from Pothi-Mala, Guru Harsahai, Punjab

Ranjha was an avatar of Indra and Heer was avatar of Apsara Meneka who was given abhi-shaap (curse) by Rishi Kapil to get born on Matlok. Rishi kapil was visiting inderlok when he got opportunity to saw Menaka for first time in king Inder darbar and his "Biraj" fell on seeing her. This led to rishi kapil cursing Menaka in anger! " you will take birth in Matlok. Ranjha was born near river chenab at house of chitar devi. As years went by a great famine came and only those people survived who were rich. Ranjha mother during famine in order to survive, sold him to a Jat family and he became an attractive young man whosoever girl saw him, fell for him saying "Ranjha Ranjha" the famous couplet popular in today times. Similarly Heer ended up being born into Choochak Clan. As the epic moves forward they fell in love and heer was married to Khera family as her father doesn't agree with Ranjha. Now Ranjha becomes a beggar and joins the Doli (Marriage) party of heer during her marriage. When ranjha gets a chance with heer alone they both suicide together and leave for Swarga back into their positions of Indra and Meneka. The authors today sing this Plot(Charitar).

Bhai Gurdas also references this epic in Vaar 27 Pauri 1

ਰਾਂਝਾ ਹੀਰ ਵਖਾਣੀਐ ਓਹੁ ਪਿਰਮ ਪਰਾਤੀ॥

Ranjha and Heer are renowned for the love they bore each other.

ਪੀਰ ਮੁਰੀਦਾ ਪਿਰਹੜੀ ਗਾਵਨਿ ਪਰਭਾਤੀ॥੧॥
But superior to all is the love, the disciples bear for their Guru. They sing it at the ambrosial hour of morning

=== 100. Tale of a Clever Woman ===
In Raghu-kul a king named Roopeswar was a famous and respected in Nagar of Ropar (now Punjab). He had a queen named "Chittar Kumari" and she was very beautiful and no other woman was equally beautiful to her. A Danav (demon) came over from Lanka to Ropar. He was enticed by the Rani and Danav mind got fixed on her. The king called his bishops for consulting to get rid of Danav. And they sent a powerful Muslim general (Mullah) to fight him off and Mullah challenged Danav with his power. Danav responded by lifting the castle around him in one hand and Mullah in other and he placed castle on his head as if he is the pillar supporting him and the castle fell on him and this is how he sent the mullah to Jampur (City of Death). Then, the king sent his second Muslim general, who Danav lifted from legs and banged him on earth and killed him. Then came another one who he picked and threw in the river.
Then came a woman in front of Danav, and she started praising the dana and this pacified the Danav. She enticed the Danav. She fed the Danav with various kind of food and wines, which made Danav happy. She started doing this every day for him and he started trusting her more and more.
One day she sat sad in front of her and Danav asked her, you take good care of me and you ask nothing for return. Tell me what you want, why are you sad and I will fulfill your wish. He asked 2 or 3 times and she responded by saying. I am bothered by an Asur (demon) and I don't think you can do anything about it.
Hearing this the Danav wrote a Jantar for her and told her take this and whosoever sees it once will be burned to ashes. She smartly took it from him and opened it and showed him immediately. Danav saw it himself and burned himself to ashes.

Lesson: Thus, the Danav who could not have been even won over by the powerful "kings of kings" Indra, ended up being deceived (Charitar) by a simple woman.

=== 101. Tale of Soni Mahiwal ===
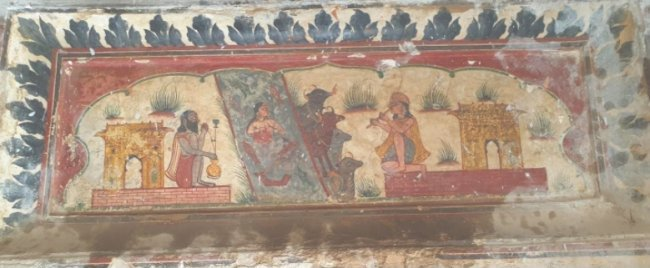
Gurdwara Bhumman Shah fresco depicting the folktale of Sohni Mahiwal located in Depalpur, Okara, Punjab, Pakistan.

On the bank of the river Ravi, there use to live a Jat named Mahiwal. Seeing him Sohni fell in love with him. When sun use to go down, she used to come visit her by crossing the river Ravi. She used to swim across the river by holding “Baked Clay Pot” or Pakka Ghadda which does not dissolves in water. One day when she started her journey, her brother woke up and started following her. The secret of her journey to meet Mahiwal was now known to her brother, but Sohni did not know her secret is revealed to her brother. Next day in morning her brother went and replaced the Pakka ghadda with Kacha Ghadda or “unbaked clay pot” which dissolves in water. Thus that night Sohni picked her kachaa ghadda and began journey. She swam half way and the Unbaked clay pot melted in waters of Ravi and sohni sank and died in water. Mahiwal waiting and waiting started searching for Sohni in Ravi waters. A strong wave current came and he also sank in the river and died.

Learning: Thus, One Person (her own Brother) constructed a plot (Charitar) which ended up killing sohni and mahiwal.

Bhai Gurdas also references this epic in Vaar 27 Pauri 1

ਮੇਹੀਵਾਲ ਨੋ ਸੋਹਣੀ ਨੈ ਤਰਦੀ ਰਾਤੀ।
The fame of Sohni who used to swim the Chenab river in the night to meet Mahival is well known.

ਪੀਰ ਮੁਰੀਦਾ ਪਿਰਹੜੀ ਗਾਵਨਿ ਪਰਭਾਤੀ॥੧॥
But superior to all is the love, the disciples bear for their Guru. They sing it at the ambrosial hour of morning

=== 108. Tale of Sassi Punnu ===
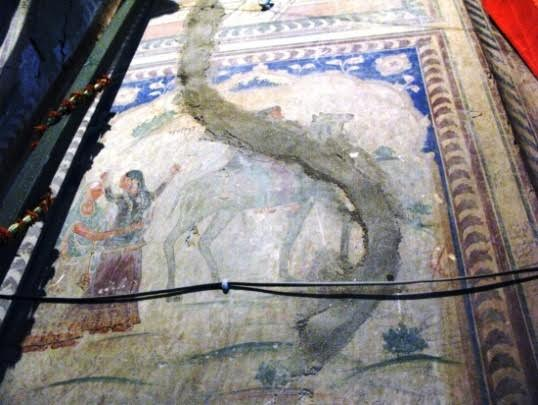
Fresco artwork of the folktale of Sassi Pannu from Pothi-Mala, Guru Harsahai, Punjab

The Rishi Kapil came over to some place and saw an Apsara named Rambha. Seeing Rambha his mind got affixed with her and his "Biraj" fell on earth. From his Biraj, Rambha got pregnant, which resulted in a girl child being born. Rambha threw that child in Sind River and went to swarga.

The girl kept floating in river Sind and Was rescued by King of Sind Brahamdatt. He started taking care of her as a daughter and named her Sassi or "Sassiya" as she was more beautiful than the Moon (Sass).

When she grew up, she was married to King Punnu. The King Punnu already had Rani before Sassi. As Punnu grew fond of Sassi, the other Elder Rani got jealous of Sassi. She plotted to kill Punnu with her servants, when King Punnu will go for hunting next time. The day of death came and King Punnu went for Hunting and the servant of Elder Rani fired his arrow and took the King down in middle of Dark jungle. The news of death came to Sassi and she went with her servants to middle of jungle to see dead body of Punnu, and seeing the body Sassi also died.

The story ends with Dharamraj Response

In Dharamraj Sabha news of death came of Sassi and Punnu, Dharamraj responded that with the jealous fervor sorrow, the Other Rani got angry and did Charitar(Plotted) to kill her Husband Punnu, with the same Sorrow she will taken, lets do this solution.

Learning: Jealousy always leads to wrong ending and is punishable in court of Dharamraj.

Dharamraj can be referenced in Guru Granth Sahib Jee, Ang 967 Line 6 Raag Raamkali: Bhatt Satta & Balwand
ਧਰਮ ਰਾਇ ਹੈ ਦੇਵਤਾ ਲੈ ਗਲਾ ਕਰੇ ਦਲਾਲੀ॥

The Righteous Judge of Dharma(DharamRaj) considered the arguments and makes the decision.

Bhai Gurdas Vaar also references this epic in Vaar 27 Pauri 1

ਸਸੀ ਪੁੰਨੂੰ ਦੋਸਤੀ ਹੁਇ ਜਾਤਿ ਅਜਾਤੀ।
The love of Sassi and Punnü, though of different castes, is everywhere spoken of.

ਪੀਰ ਮੁਰੀਦਾ ਪਿਰਹੜੀ ਗਾਵਨਿ ਪਰਭਾਤੀ॥੧॥
But superior to all is the love, the disciples bear for their Guru. They sing it at the ambrosial hour of morning

== Missing tale ==
The 325th Charitar of the Charitropakhyan is missing in a plethora of Dasam Granth Manuscripts, and for this reason the Charitropakhyan is typically listed as having 404 charitars, even though the last charitar gives the notation of being the 405th (at the end of the Chaupai Sahib)

ਇਤਿ ਸ੍ਰੀ ਚਰਿਤ੍ਰ ਪਖ੍ਯਾਨੇ ਤ੍ਰਿਯਾ ਚਰਿਤ੍ਰੇ ਮੰਤ੍ਰੀ ਭੂਪ ਸੰਬਾਦੇ ਚਾਰ ਸੌ ਪਾਂਚ ਚਰਿਤ੍ਰ ਸਮਾਪਤਮ ਸਤੁ ਸੁਭਮ ਸਤੁ ॥੪੦੫॥੭੫੫੮॥ ਅਫਜੰੂ ॥

eit sree charitr pakhayaane tirayaa charitre ma(n)tree bhoop sa(n)baadhe chaar sau paa(n)ch charitr samaapatam sat subham sat ||405||7558|| afaja(n)oo ||

Here ends the Chartar Pakhyan, which catalogues the stories of Women and Ministers. End of the 405th charitar.

== Authorship ==
The different theories on the authorship of the Pakhyan Charitar:

1. The historical and traditional view is that the entire work was composed by Guru Gobind Singh himself.
2. The entire collection was composed by the poets of the Guru's entourage.
3. Only a part of the work was composed by the Guru, while the rest was composed by the other poets.
4. The work is not related to the Guru, but was instead written by an unknown poet.

=== Historical references ===
The following are historical references from the 18th Century, which claim that Guru Gobind Singh had written tales at Anandpur as well as at Dina Kangar:

==== Letter to Mata Sundri, Bhai Mani Singh ====
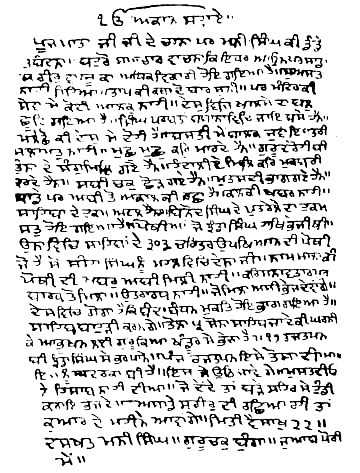
Bhai Mani Singh's letter addressed to Mata Sundari in April 1716 concerning the condition of the Sikhs and his mission of collecting Guru Gobind Singh's compositions. It mentions the Sri Charitropakhyan as being the composition of Guru Gobind Singh

The letter is claimed to have been written by Bhai Mani Singh to Mata Sundari in 1716, after 8 years of the demise of Guru Gobind Singh. This manuscript provides evidence of existence of 303 Charitars, Shastar Nam Mala and Krishna Avtar compositions. This manuscript was written before compilation of dasam granth during collections of various compositions. Among critics Gyani Harnam Singh Balabh believes that only 303 Charitars were written by Guru Gobind Singh among 404 Charitars in Charitropakhyan. According to Robin Rinehart in Debating the Dasam Granth (2011), the letter first appeared publicly in the late 1920s and its style of writing and handwriting was analyzed by Rattan Singh Jaggi in the 1960s who concluded that it does not match with Bhai Mani Singh's time period, casting doubts on its authenticity.

==== Parchi Gobind Singh - Bava Sevadas ====
This manuscript was finished sometime in the first quarter of the eighteenth century (around 1741) by Seva Das, an Udasi. He mentioned that Guru Gobind Singh had written tales in Persian in Zafarnama, called Hikaaitaan during his lifetime. Many of these tales are the Persian translations of the narratives in Charitropakhyan.

==== Mahima Parkash, Sarup Das Bhalla ====
This book was completed by Sarup Das, who belong to lineage of Guru Amar Dass, in 1776. He had access to whole Dasam Granth and mentioned that 404 Charitars and Chaubis Avtar was written by Guru Gobind Singh. He states:

ਦੋਹਰਾ॥
ਬੇਦ ਬਿਦਿਆ ਪ੍ਰਕਾਸ਼ ਕੋ ਸੰਕਲਪ ਧਰਿਓ ਮਨ ਦਿਆਲ ॥
ਪੰਡਤ ਪੁਰਾਨ ਇੱਕਤ੍ਰ ਕਰ ਭਾਖਾ ਰਚੀ ਬਿਸਾਲ ॥

ਚੋਪਈ॥
ਆਗਿਆ ਕੀਨੀ ਸਤਗੁਰ ਦਿਆਲਾ ॥
ਬਿਦਿਆਵਾਨ ਪੰਡਤ ਲੇਹੁ ਭਾਲ ॥
ਜੋ ਜਿਸ ਬਿਦਾਆ ਗਿਆਤਾ ਹੋਇ ॥
ਵਹੀ ਪੁਰਾਨ ਸੰਗ ਲਿਆਵੇ ਸੋਇ ॥
ਦੇਸ ਦੇਸ ਕੋ ਸਿਖ ਚਲਾਏ ॥
ਪੰਡਤ ਪੁਰਾਨ ਸੰਗਤਿ ਲਿਆਏ ॥
ਬਾਨਾਰਸ ਆਦ ਜੋ ਬਿਦਿਆ ਠੌਰਾ ॥

ਪੰਡਤ ਸਭ ਬਿਦਿਆ ਸਿਰਮੌਰਾ ॥
ਸਤਿਗੁਰ ਕੇ ਆਇ ਇਕਤ੍ਰ ਸਭ ਭਏ ॥
ਬਹੁ ਆਦਰ ਸਤਗੁਰ ਜੀ ਦਏ ॥
ਮਿਰਜਾਦਾਬਾਧ ਖਰਚ ਕੋ ਦਇਆ ॥
ਖੇਦ ਬਿਭੇਦ ਕਾਹੂ ਨਹੀਂ ਭਇਆ ॥
ਗੁਰਮੁਖੀ ਲਿਖਾਰੀ ਨਿਕਟ ਬੁਲਾਏ ॥
ਤਾ ਕੋ ਸਭ ਬਿਧ ਦਈ ਬਣਾਏ ॥
ਕਰ ਭਾਖਾ ਲਿਖੋ ਗੁਰਮੁਖੀ ਭਾਇ ॥
ਮੁਨਿਮੋ ਕੋ ਦੇਹੁ ਕਥਾ ਸੁਨਾਇ ॥

ਦੋਹਰਾ ॥
ਨਨੂਆ ਬੈਰਾਗੀ ਸ਼ਿਆਮ ਕਬ ਬ੍ਰਹਮ ਭਾਟ ਜੋ ਆਹਾ ॥
ਭਈ ਨਿਹਚਲ ਫਕੀਰ ਗੁਰ ਬਡੇ ਗੁਨਗ ਗੁਨ ਤਾਹਾ॥
ਅਵਰ ਕੇਤਕ ਤਿਨ ਨਾਮ ਨ ਜਾਨੋ ॥
ਲਿਖੇ ਸਗਲ ਪੁਨਿ ਕਰੇ ਬਿਖਾਨੋ ॥
ਚਾਰ ਬੇਦ ਦਸ ਅਸ਼ਟ ਪੁਰਾਨਾ ॥
ਛੈ ਸਾਸਤ੍ਰ ਸਿਮ੍ਰਤ ਆਨਾ ॥

ਚੋਪਈ॥
ਚੋਬਿਸ ਅਵਤਾਰ ਕੀ ਭਾਖਾ ਕੀਨਾ॥
ਚਾਰ ਸੋ ਚਾਰ ਚਲਿਤ੍ਰ ਨਵੀਨਾ॥
ਭਾਖਾ ਬਣਾਈ ਪ੍ਰਭ ਸ੍ਰਵਣ ਕਰਾਈ॥
ਭਏ ਪ੍ਰਸੰਨ ਸਤਗੁਰ ਮਨ ਭਾਈ॥
ਸਭ ਸਹੰਸਕ੍ਰਿਤ ਭਾਖਾ ਕਰੀ ॥
ਬਿਦਿਆ ਸਾਗਰ ਗ੍ਰਿੰਥ ਪਰ ਚੜੀ ॥

== Relationship with Hikaaitaan ==
The following is a list of Hikayats, which are similar to narratives in Charitropakhyan, rewritten in the Persian Language. In fact, many of these are the Persian translations of the narratives in Charitropakhyan.

- Hikayat 4 is Persian adaptation of Charitra 52
- Hikayat 5 is Persian adaptation of Charitra 267
- Hikayat 8 is Persian adaptation of Charitra 118
- Hikayat 9 is Persian adaptation of Charitra 290
- Hikayat 11 is Persian adaptation of Charitra 246

The similarity of narratives in Hikayats and Charitropakhyan serves directs the single Authorship of both compositions.

== See also ==
- Charitar 2
- Charitar 71
- Charitar 266
- Charitar 373
- Chaupai Sahib, the 405th Charitar
