= Hikaaitaan =

Chapter in Sri Dasam Granth

Hikaaitaan ਹਿਕਾਇਤਾਂ • حکایت
- Dasam Granth
- ← Zafarnama
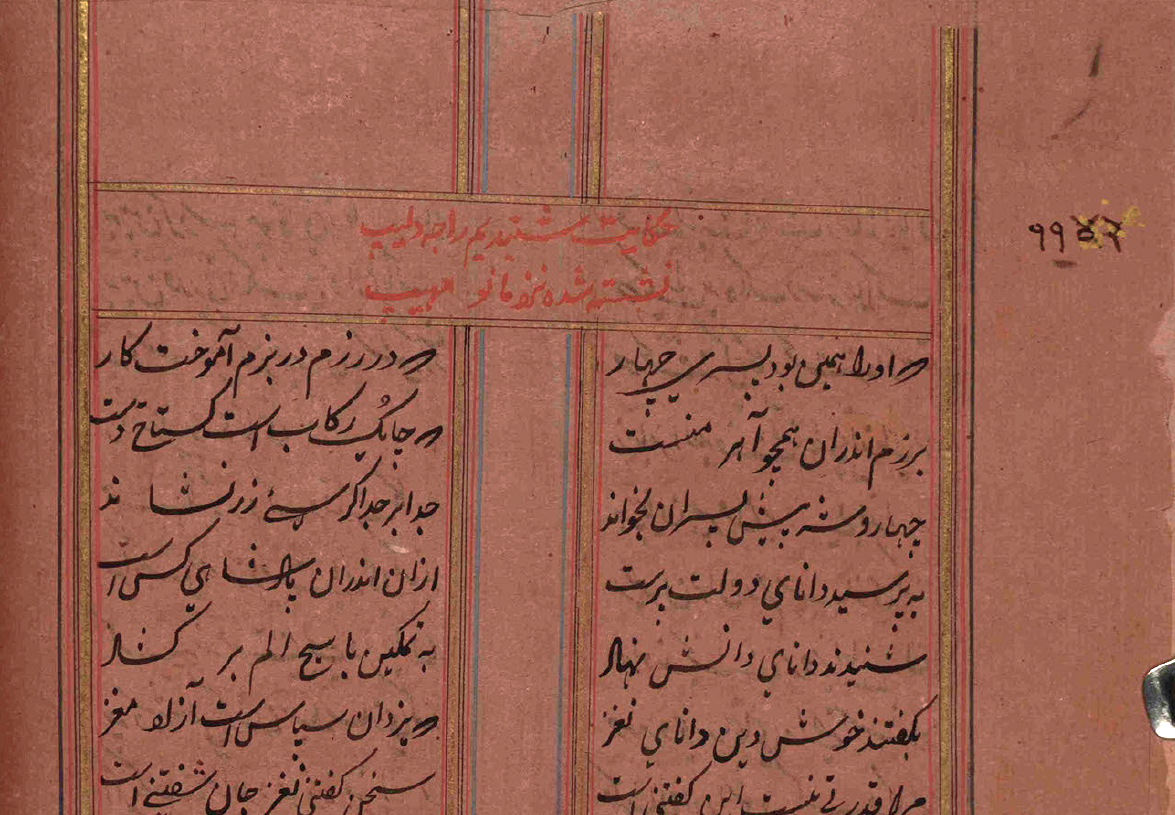
- Heading of the second "Hikayat" of the Dasam Granth, written by Bhai Daya Singh, present within the "Aurangabadi Bir"

Information
- Religion: Sikhism
- Author: Guru Gobind Singh
- Chapters: 11 or 12 (if counting the Zafarnama "Dastaan")
- Verses: 756

Hikaaitaan or Hikāyatān (Punjabi: ਹਿਕਾਇਤਾਂ (Gurmukhi) • حکایت (Persian), pronunciation: [ɦɪkäːɪt̪ãː], lit. ‘realities’) is a title given to the semi-legendary set of 11 tales (hikayat; Gurmukhi: ਹਿਕਾਇਤਾ, romanized: Hikā'itā), composed in the Gurmukhi/Persian vernacular (with a few words in the Majha dialect), whose authorship is traditionally attributed to Guru Gobind Singh. It is the last composition of the second scripture of Sikhs, Dasam Granth, and some believe it to be appended to Zafarnamah—the letter to Mughal emperor Aurangzeb. It is part of the Hikayat genre.

Traditionally, the set of tales is said to have been written with the Zafarnama at Dina, Punjab, in 1704 CE, whereas an opposing view is that they were written in 1698 CE at Paonta Sahib. In total, there are 11 tales—composed of 752 couplets; however, some individuals count the Zafarnama as the first hikayat, which brings the count to 12. Each tale begins with praise of the Almighty. This composition is present in all old manuscripts, including those of Mani Singh, Motibagh, Sangrur, Anandpuri, and Patna manuscripts.

== Authorship and relation with Zafarnama ==
As per early Sikh historical resources, Parchi Patshahi Dasvin (Sevadas, 1741) and Gurbilas Patshahi 10 (Kuir Singh, 1751), the Hikayats were composed by Guru Gobind Singh at Dina-Kangar, Punjab and is part of Zafarnamah which was sent along with Zafarnama. Koer Singh believes that Guru Gobind Singh had written 12 hikayats in the Zafarnama. In Sakhi 13, Sevadas mentioned that Guru Gobind Singh had written fables of many kings and also mentioned his own history in Zafarnama.

On the contrary, many manuscripts of the Dasam Granth from the late 1600s contain the Hikayats. The Anandpuri Bir has the Hikayats written in it, while the Zafarnamah was appened later at the end of the manuscript.

The traditional view is that all the Hikayats were composed by Guru Gobind Singh to Aurangzeb. Pundit Narain Singh, who did a complete exegesis of the Dasam Granth, also had the same view. Many of these tales are the Persian translations of the narratives in Charitropakhyan.

Various scholars have claimed that Hikayats are not part of Zafarnama, as in their viewpoint these tales do not show any relation with the letter and were written by court poets. Manuscript also shows that the Hikayats were written independently of the Zafarnama. Pritpal Singh Bindra was the first to translate the Hikayats into English, and he presents his case where he shows various mentions of intoxicating "green liquid" and "red liquid" being called upon by the writer, alleging that this is a proof that the Hikayats could not have been written by Guru Gobind Singh.

ਬਿਦਿਹ ਸਾਕੀਯਾ ਸਾਗ਼ਰੇ ਸਬਜ਼ ਗੂੰ ॥

'Oh! Saki Give me the cup full of green (liquid)

ਕਿ ਮਾਰਾ ਬਕਾਰਸਤ ਜੰਗ ਅੰਦਰੂੰ ॥੨੦॥

'Which I need at the time of struggle(20)

ਲਬਾਲਬ ਬਕੁਨ ਦਮ ਬਦਮ ਨੋਸ਼ ਕੁਨ ॥

'Fill it up to the brim so that I can drink it with every breath

ਗ਼ਮੇ ਹਰ ਦੁ ਆਲਮ ਫ਼ਰਾਮੋਸ਼ ਕੁਨ ॥੨੧॥੧੨॥

'And forget the afflictions of both the worlds(21)(12)

The themes of the "Saqi" (bartender) are also common tropes in mystical Sufi literature.

It was originally written in the Perso-Arabic script rather than in Gurmukhi.

== Tales ==
As per Harbans Singh, the genre of the tales "ranges from the romantic and chivalrous to the fantastic and the macabre" and were written for the tastes of a medieval Indian audience. All the tales begin with a number but this chronological ordering only begins with the second tale, leading scholars to theorize what the first tale is or if it has been lost. The following are tales and brief descriptions of the hikayats (including the Zafarnama as the first):

1. Tale of Guru Gobind Singh and Emperor Aurangzeb – An autobiography of Guru Gobind Singh that includes philosophical, political, and satirical aspects. More commonly known as the Zafarnama. Other scholars postulate that the first four verses of the second Hikayat is actually the first tale, in which Sanskritized Braj verses praise God.
2. Tale of King Daleep and His Four Sons – Guru Gobind Singh had lost his four sons and was a direct reference to that. The story involves four sons of a Raja, three of which were gifted with vast riches but squandered it all but the youngest son was just gifted a seed, which he had planted and was able to harvest food until he eventually founded a grand city. The story may have been written with the Mughal imperial family in-mind, specifically Aurangzeb and his sons, as a possible moral lesson.
3. Tale of the Emperor of China – Explaining the qualities of a perfect ruler, with political and philosophical aspects.
4. Tale of King Subhat Singh and Bachitarmati – How women are equal to men and how the queen conquered areas from Rajasthan to Poland. The story involves an undaunted rani defeating Raja Subhat Singh in battle in order to marry him. This section is notable for the only attestation of the word پلند ("Poland", transliterated into Gurmukhi as ਪਿਲੰਦੇ) in both Persian and Punjabi literature.
5. Tale of King Sabal Singh
6. Tale of King Chakrawati and Qazi Daughter
7. Tale of King Darab and Queen of Rome
8. Tale of Princess of Bilistan
9. Tale of King of France and His Wife
10. Tale of King Mayindra and Advisor's Daughter
11. Tale of King Sher Shah and Tycoon's Daughter
12. Tale of Pathan Raheem Khan and His Wife – this is a cannibalistic story that involves an adulterous Pathan wife murdering and cooking the remains of her lover up to feed her husband and his friends. The wife was fearful of her husband and did this to win his approval.

== Relationship with Sri Charitropakhyan ==
The following is a list of Hikayats which are similar to narratives in Charitropakhyan. In fact, six of the Hikayats are the Persian translations of the narratives found within the Charitropakhyan.

- Hikayat 4 and Charitra 52
- Hikayat 5 and Charitra 267
- Hikayat 8 and Charitra 118
- Hikayat 9 and Charitra 290
- Hikayat 11 and Charitra 246

== Gallery ==
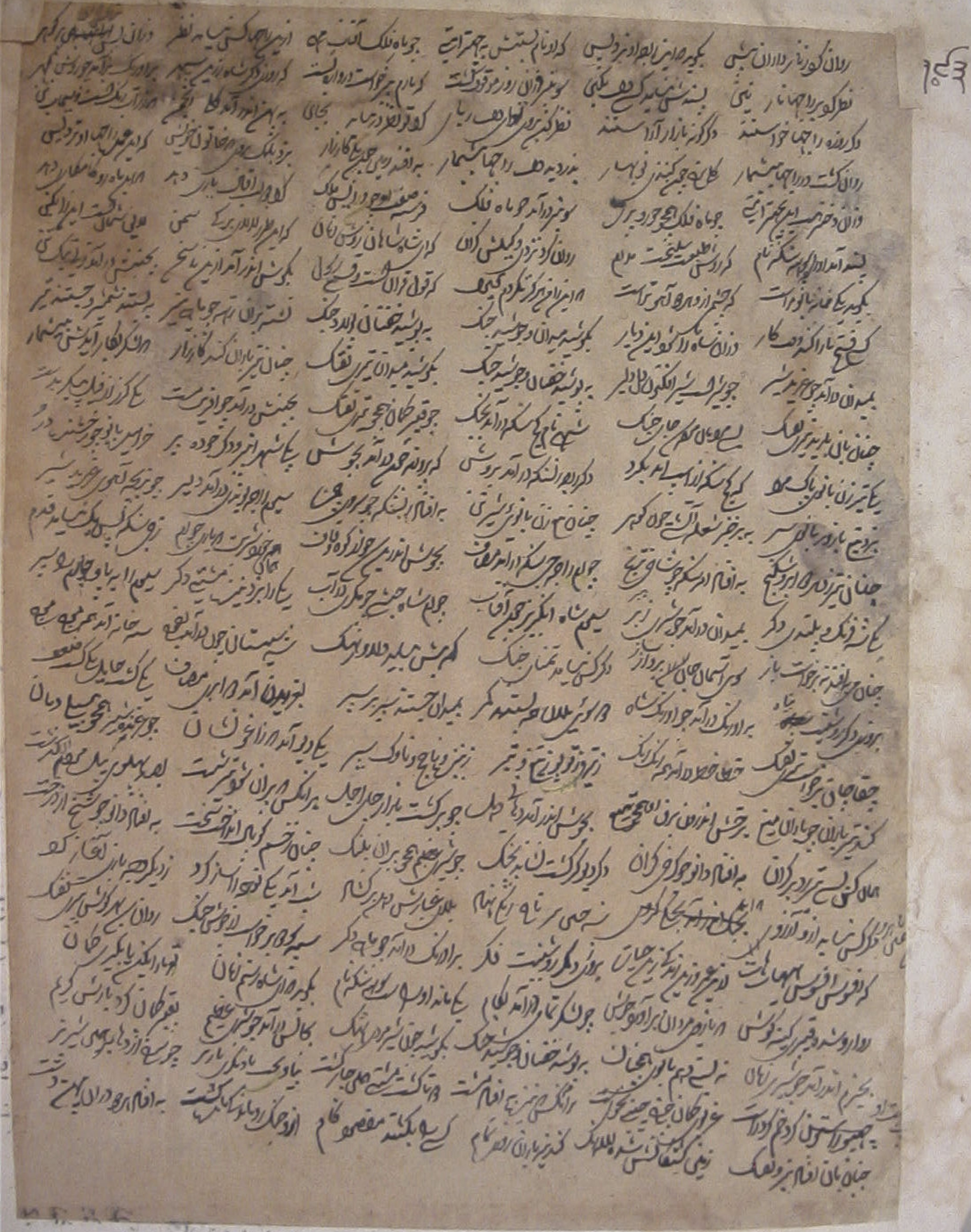
Folio of the Hikaaitaan section of the Bhai Mani Singh Vali Khari Bir

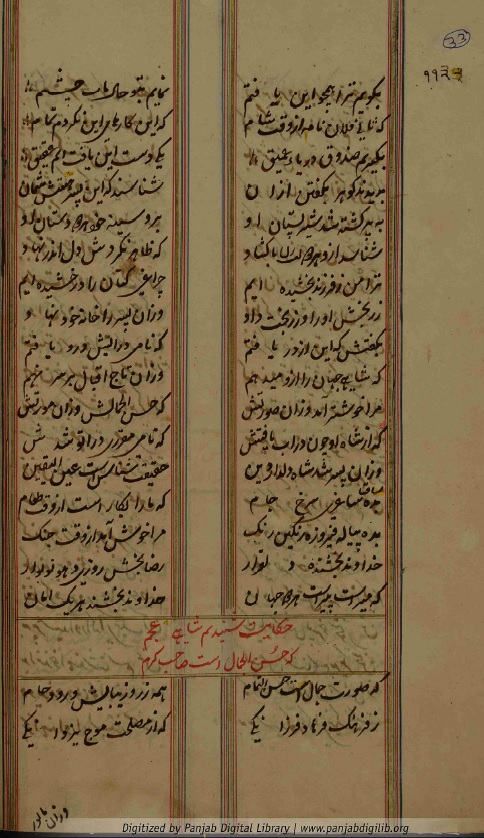
Ending and beginning of the 8th "Hikayat" of the Dasam Granth, written by Bhai Daya Singh, present within the "Aurangabadi Bir"

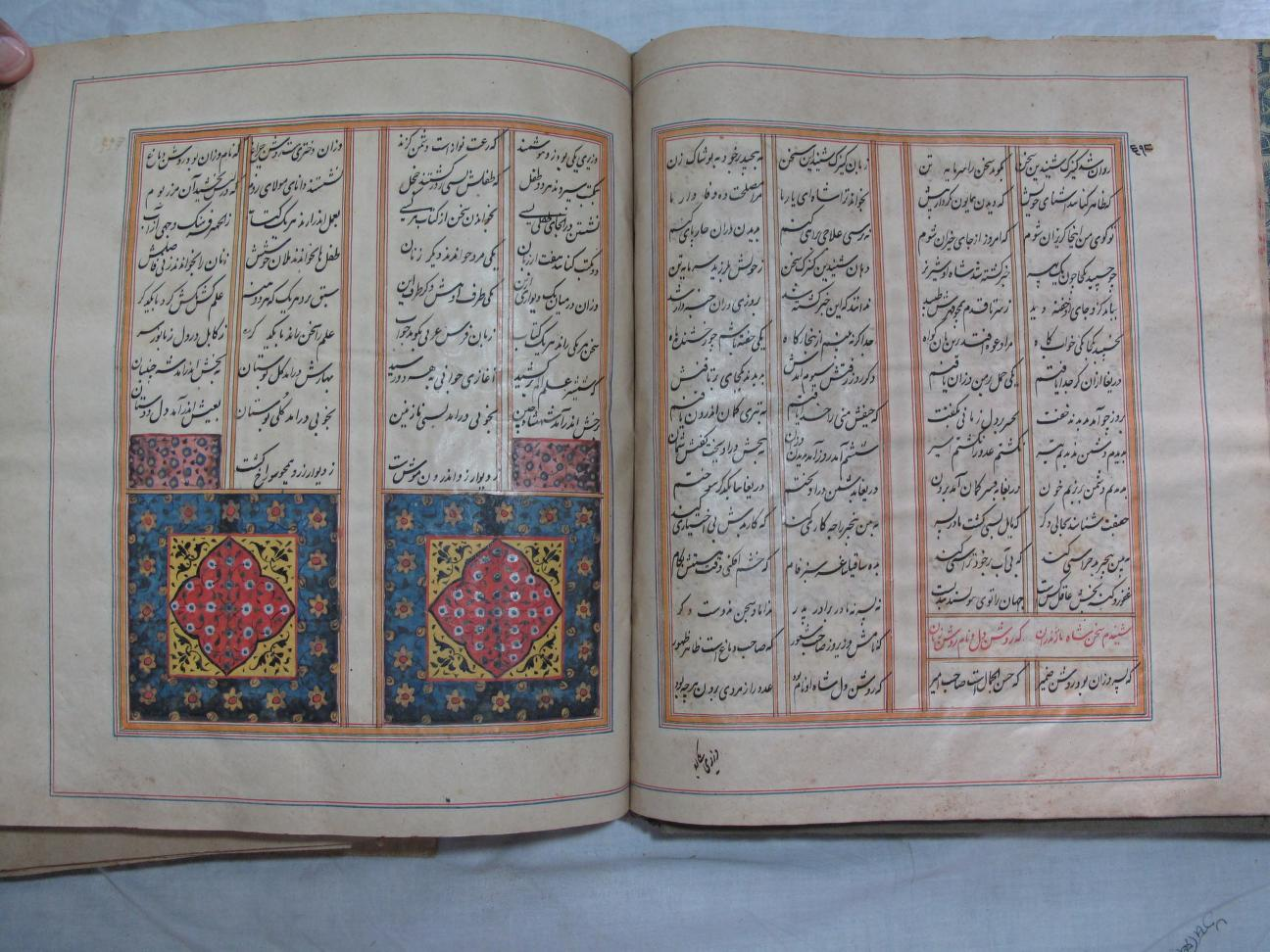
Ending verses of the 12th "Hikayat" from the 1765 "Patna Missal" Dasam Granth Manuscript

== See also ==
- List of Hikayat
