= Kisah Pelayaran Abdullah ke Mekah =

Malay literary text

Kisah Pelayaran Abdullah ke Mekah (Jawi: قصه ڤلايران عبدالله ك مكه; English: The story of Abdullah’s voyage to Mekah) was the last work of Abdullah bin Abdul Kadir. The work recounts Abdullah's voyage from Singapore to Jeddah on his Hajj pilgrimage to Mecca. The summarized three parts of the story was first published by the Cermin Mata magazine in Singapore in 1858-1859.

Abdullah set sail from Singapore by a ship named Subulus Salam in February 1854. Along his voyage, he sketched the images of places he saw from onboard and wrote his personal experiences meeting different groups of people in places he visited like Calicut. Abdullah died in Jeddah the following October 1854 at the age of 58 before he reached Mecca.

The version of Cermin Mata magazine that was published by the Protestant missionary agencies, only contains Abdullah's voyage up to the coast of Jeddah. H.C. Klinkert, a Dutch scholar, published a Dutch translation which was more complete based on manuscript copies obtained from publishers in Singapore. He later published the Malay edition in 1889 with the title Kisah pelayaran Abdullah ke Judah (“The story of Abdullah’s voyage to Judah”), but this time based on the issue of Cermin Mata.

In 1964, the version edited by Kassim Ahmad was published in Kuala Lumpur. Amin Sweeney also edited a new edition of Karya Lengkap Abdullah bin Abdulkadir Munsyi: Jilid 1 (“The Complete Works Abdullah bin Abdulkadir Munsyi: Volume 1”) published in Jakarta in 2005.
