= Charitar 2 =

Tale in Dasam Granth

Charitar 2 is one of 404 tales present in Sri Charitropakhyan composition present in Dasam Granth. This tale is also called Katha Tale of Raja Chitar Singh and Rani Chitar Vati or Tale of Raja Chitar Singh and Rani Chitar Vati. This is the base tale of the whole composition of Sri Charitropakhyan from where central plots formed. The plot is explained in the second tale which is as follows:

King Chitra Singh of Chitravati married the damsel of Indra's kingdom. She gave birth to a son named Hanuvant Singh. Damsel left the king when he got old. He ordered his employees to find her but instead found another, similar looking girl named Chitramati. Chitramati was the daughter of the ruler of Odchaa. To marry her, he had a fight with her father, the ruler of Odchaa. Chitramati was about the age of the son of Chitra Singh. She got heavily attracted to him and tried to seduce him, but Hanuvant Singh was religious in thought and did not go for incest. Then she created a drama and accused Hanuvant Singh of raping her. King Chitra Singh believed her blindly without knowing the side of his son and sentenced him to death.

Mantri, the wise adviser of the King knew that Chitramati was not of a pious character and falsely blamed Hanuvant Singh. In order to prevent this injustice to be inflicted onto Hanuvant Singh, the adviser shared various accounts of stories depicting different situations intended to make the King realize his folly and improve his decision-making skill.

The tale contains 30 verses includes 4 Chopais, 2 Swaiyas, 1 Chandd, 2 Adils and 9 Dohras.
