= Charitar 266 =

Charitar 266 is one of 404 tales present in Sri Charitropakhyan composition present in Dasam Granth. This tale is also called Katha Sri Ran Khamb Kala or Tale of Rann Khamb Kala. This tale is among a set narrated by wise minister to King Chitra Singh to prevent the King's son's execution, due to false allegation of attempt of rape by King's younger wife against Prince Hanuvant Singh.

This tale is fierce verbal dialogue between Sri Rann Khamb Kala, Hindu pundit and daughter of King Sumati, on different religious principles like idolatry, pilgrimage, trimurti, charity, salvation, enlightenment, human worship, avatarvaad, where Hindu pundit lost the verbal battle and later accepted the thoughts of Sumati's daughter after punishment by her. This tale also glorifies uses of bhang in religion and military.

The tale contains 125 verses including 16 chopais, 9 adil, 6 chandds, 4 kabits and 10 dohras.
