= Hikayat Iskandar Zulkarnain =

Malay epic

Hikayat Iskandar Zulkarnain (Arabic: حكاية إسكندر ذو القرنين, lit. 'The Story/Exploits of Alexander') is a Malay epic in the tradition of the Alexander Romance describing fictional exploits of Dhu al-Qarnayn (Zulkarnain), a king briefly mentioned in the Quran. The oldest existing manuscript is dated 1713, but is in a poor state. Another manuscript was copied by Muhammad Cing Sa'idullah about 1830.

There are two versions of the text: a recension from the Malayan peninsula and a Sumatran recension. The Sumatran version begins with a doxology found in the Peninsular, whereas the ending of the Peninsular is extended past that of the Sumatran to include up to the point when Alexander died.

Influence of the Alexander legends on Malaysian tradition was significant. Court chronicles were produced to claim genealogical descent from Alexander. Some claimed this descent from Alexander occurred through the lineage of Raja Rajendra Chola, an emperor from the eleventh century described in the Malay Annals. Influence also poured into Buginese and Javanese literature.

== Synopsis ==
Iskandar Zulkarnain is claimed to be a direct antecedent of the Minangkabau kingdoms of Sumatra by their rulers. The best known Minangkabau ruler, Adityavarman, who ruled over Sumatra between 1347 and 1374 AD claimed for himself the name Maharajadiraja, 'a great lord of kings.' It was William Marsten who first publicized this link at the end of the 18th century.

== Sources and historical context ==
The hikayat genre was first introduced to Pasai in the mid-fourteenth century. The text has no ultimate source but is a composite of various origins, including the Arabic Sīrat al-Iskandar, the Shahnameh of the Persian poet Ferdowsi, and the Malay Hikayat Muhammad Hanifiyyah.

== Related texts ==
Two related Malaysian texts include the Hikayat Raja Iskandar ("Story of King Alexander") and Hikayat Ya’juj wa-Ma’juj ("Story of Gog and Magog").

== Editions ==
- Pieter Johannes van Leeuwen, De maleische Alexanderroman (Meppel, 1937)

== See also ==
- List of Hikayat
- Indonesian literature
- Alexander the Great in legend
