= Charitar 71 =

Charitar 71 is an auto-biographical tale presented in Sri Charitropakhyan composition present in Dasam Granth. This tale is also called "Tale of Kapal Mochan". This tale is added to list of tales narrated by wise minister to King Chitra Singh to prevent the King's son from a death sentence, due to the false allegation of attempted rape of the King's younger wife by Prince Hanuvant Singh.

The tales is told in 10 stanzas with 3 Chopais and 4 Dohras.

== Synopsis ==
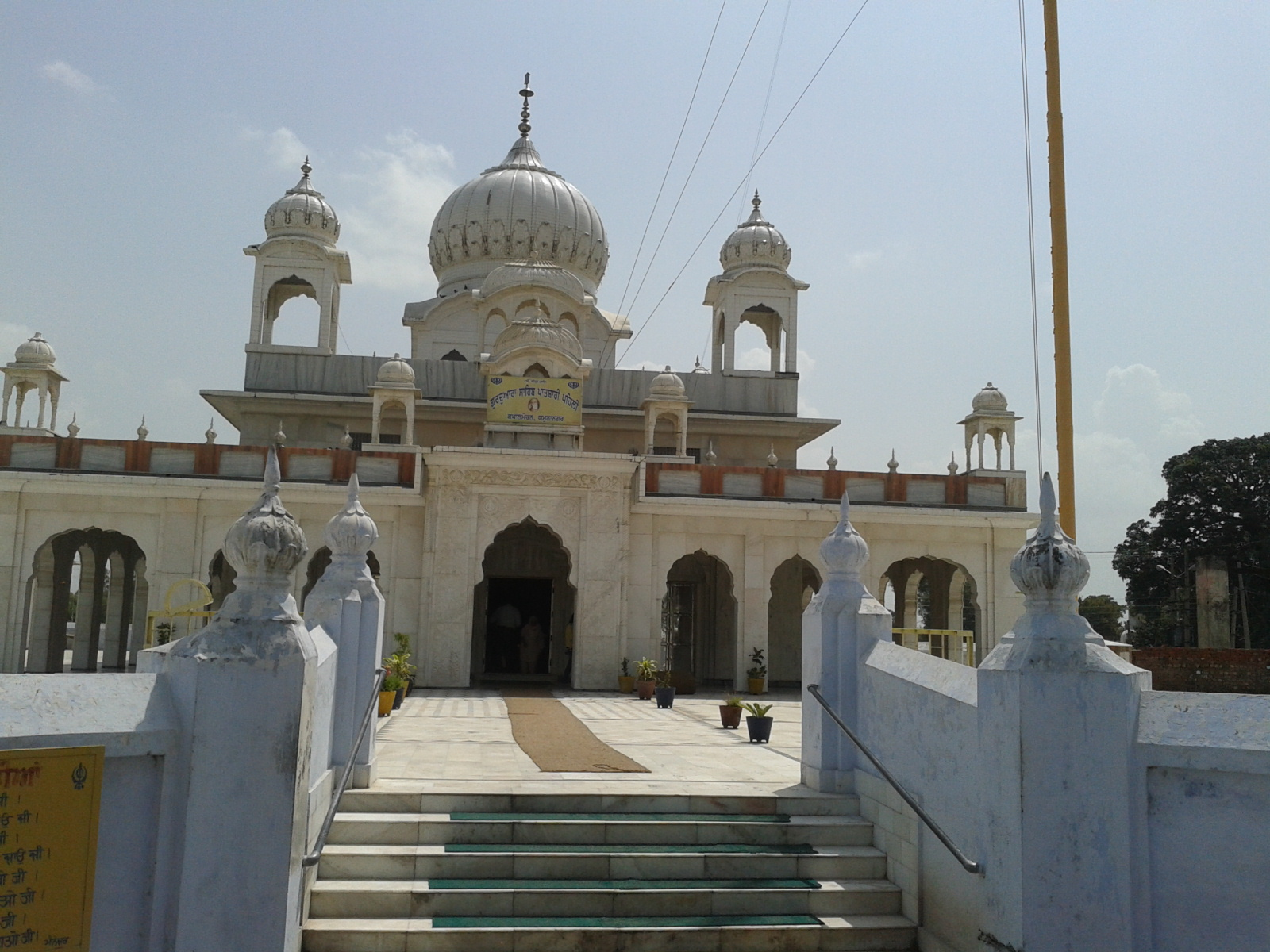
Gurdwara Kapal Mochan, commemorates visit of Nanak and Gobind Singh

After Battle of Bhangani, Guru Gobind Singh heads towards Kapal Mochan, an ancient pilgrimage of Hindus. For honoring soldiers who fought in Battle, Guru Gobind Singh sent some of his Singhs to Buria to bring turban. Singhs went to Paonta and Buria to purchase robes but no robes were available in city. At same time, there was huge gathering of people. At morning time, Guru Gobind Singh found that pilgrims are urinating and doing toilet on small distances from holy pond. This pollute the place and especially ponds during heavy rains. Guru Gobind Singh complained the local priests about their mismanagement, as pond water is used for bathing, drinking and even for performing religious rituals. Temple priests said that people do not listen even on multiple requests and requested Guru Gobind Singh to provide some permanent solution.

To hit two with one arrow, Guru Gobind Singh asked Singhs that if they found any person urinating or passing stools at short distances of ponds, just remove his turban and say him to leave the pilgrimage. The next day, Singhs started removing turban of such persons, which leads to stampede and many turbans fall. The turbans were collected, washed and same is given in honor and remaining were sold. Thus by solving his purpose and temple management.
