= Charitar 373 =

Story from the Dasam Granth used to save a falsely accused prince from execution

Charitar 373 is one of 404 tales presented in Sri Charitropakhyan composition present in Dasam Granth. This tale is also called "Katha Hingal Devi" or Tale of Hingula Devi. This tale is narrated by the wise minister to King Chitra Singh to prevent the King's son from a death sentence, due to the false allegation of attempted rape of the King's younger wife by Prince Hanuvant Singh.

The tale condemns the concept of religious miracles. The tales is told in 24 stanzas with 4 Chopais and 3 Adil and 1 Dohra.

== Synopsis ==
The primary character is Aftab Devi, named Hingula Devi who had debate and discourse with the King and religious priests. King Bikat Singh lived in Dalautabad with his beautiful queen Bhan Manjari. Trader Bheem Sen also lived there with his beautiful wife Aaftaab Devi.

One day Aftaab Devi thought of a way to become Bhiwani. One night she told people that she was blessed by Bhiwani and whatever she wished would happen. People fell at her feet and wanted her blessings. She became everyone's mother. This news reached the king. The king was told that a woman known as Hingla Devi called herself after the goddess Bhiwani and allowed rich and poor to touch her feet. Due to her fame people did not care for the Qazi, Maulana, Yogi and Brahmins and she received more offerings than them. They took her to the king and started ridiculing her and told her to show them some miracle so that they too could believe her to be Kiwanis.

The woman told the King that the Muslims consider the mosque to be the house of the Prophet Muhammad while Brahmins consider the stones to be their gods. She promised that if any Muslims or Brahmins performed miracle, that she would, too. The King laughed and called all Brahmins, Qazis, Yogis and sanyasis, announcing that either they would show him a miracles or he would kill them. They all failed. The King relented and allowed them to live after a flogging of seven hundred strokes.

He told the Qazis to show him something from the house of prophet or shave their heads. He told the Brahmins to show a miracle or he would throw their statues into the river. He told the Sanyasi to show him a miracle or get their matted hair removed from their heads. He told the ‘ghonas’ to produce a miracle or he would throw their necklaces into the river. They all started crying and they remained quiet.

Hingla Devi then told the people that the sword was the biggest miracle. The second miracle is the command called Kaal, whose circle of life lives in the fourteen worlds. The third miracle is speech from which every person can gather the knowledge of right and wrong. The fourth miracle is money that makes a king out of a pauper. The King became happy on hearing her speech. He gave money to her. She had called herself the mother of everyone and now she had saved her life.
