= Fatehnama =

Letter written by Guru Gobind Singh

Fatehnama فتح نامه
- Dasam Granth
- ← Sri Charitropakhyan Zafarnama →
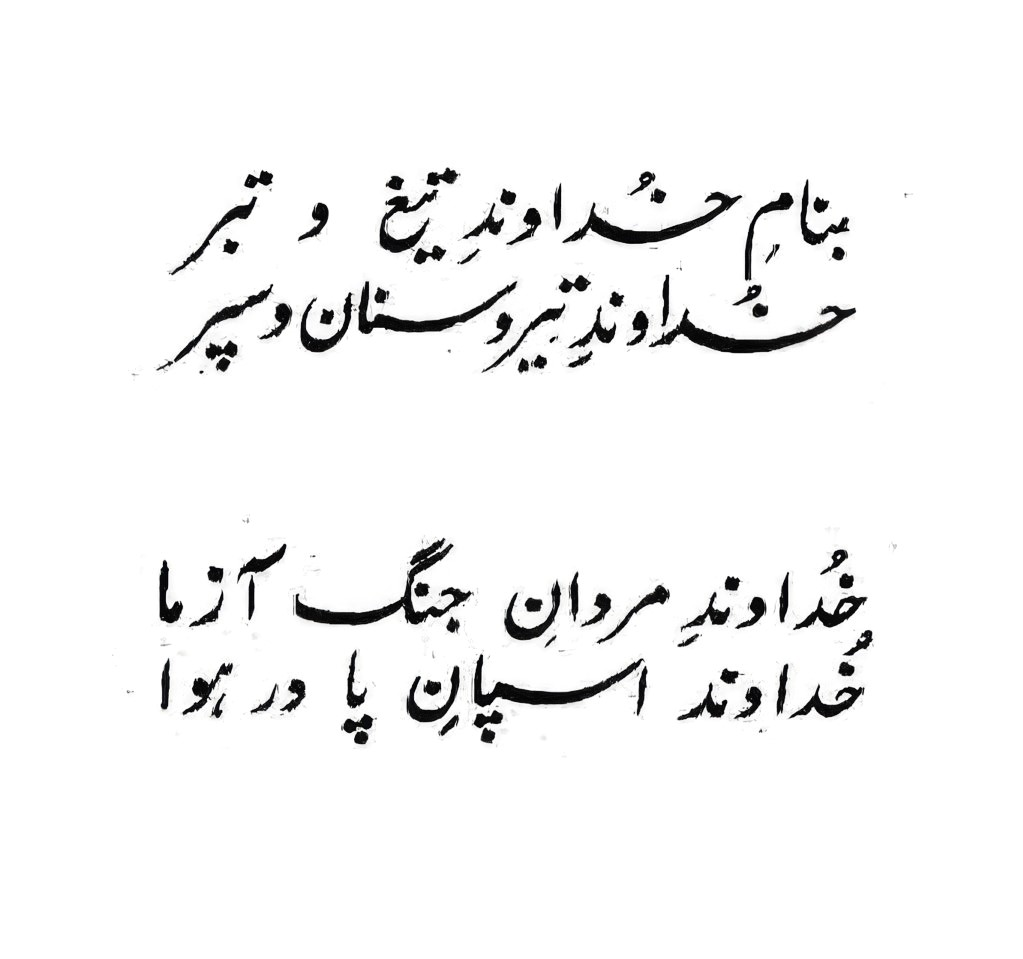
- First verse couplet of the Fatehnamah in Nastaliq Script

Information
- Religion: Sikhism
- Author: Guru Gobind Singh
- Language: Persian
- Period: 1704–1705
- Verses: 23 and a half couplets extant (more than 100 couplets originally)

Fatehnama (“The Book of Conquest”; Punjabi: ਫਤਿਹਨਾਮਾ (Gurmukhi) • فتہ ناما (Shahmukhi); Persian: فتح نامه [Fatehnameh]), also known as Namah-i-Guru Gobind Singh or the Jangnamah (Gurmukhi: ਜੰਗਨਾਮਾ, Persian: جنگ نامه) is a partially surviving Persian composition attributed to Guru Gobind Singh.

== History ==
=== Composition ===
The composition is believed to have originated as a letter sent by the Guru to Mughal emperor Aurangzeb sometime after the Second Battle of Chamkaur. It is believed by some to be written and dispatched before the Guru learnt of the extrajudicial executions of his two younger sons, Zorawar Singh and Fateh Singh, at the Mughal court. According to some, it was written and dispatched by the Guru prior to the far more popular and remembered Zafarnama, which was sent afterwards. Some scholars consider Fatehnama as part of Zafarnama.

=== Dispatchment ===
The Fatehnama was dispatched from the location of Lamma Jatpura in the Jagraon region of modern-day western Ludhiana district. According to others, it was written and dispatched from Machhiwara. Bhai Daya Singh was dispatched by the Guru to deliver the letter to Aurangzeb. He was aided by the Priest Sayyad, Nabhi Khan, and Ghani Khan.

=== Discovery and publishing ===
The first historical mention of the Fatehnama is found in an article published in the July–August 1922 edition of the Nagari Pracharini Patrika periodical, when a certain Babu Jagan Nath Das claims to have come across and prepared a copy of purported Persian work of Guru Gobind Singh in circa 1890 that contained more than 100 couplets written in Persian, but was not identifiable as the well-known Zafarnama. The work was in the form of a manuscript kept in the possession of a mahant of Takht Patna Sahib named Baba Sumer Singh (whose term in office lasted from 1882 to 1902). Sumer Singh was a descendant of Guru Amar Das, the third Sikh guru. Since the copy he had prepared was lost and the owner of the original manuscript was deceased and as such the document could not be located, Babu Jagan Nath Das had to reproduce the work based solely off of his memory, which led to the incomplete Fatehnama of today of 23 complete couplets and 1 incomplete couplet. He sent a written copy of his remembrance to Umrao Singh Majithia, who forwarded it to Bhai Vir Singh whom would publish the Fatehnama, alongside his Punjabi translation of it, in an essay titled Uchch da Pir found within the publication of Khalsa Samchar dated to 16 July 1942. The Fatehnama would further be published by Kapur Singh and Ganda Singh in their own works.

== Content ==
Fatehnameh audio recording, recited by a native Iranian

In Fatehnama Guru Gobind Singh mentions that despite oaths his army and civilians were attacked. The Guru calls it a conspiracy and says it failed. The Guru says that he is still living and ready to fight. The Guru mentions that despite all of his loss in the Battle of Chamkaur he is in Chardikala. The Guru states he is not afraid and is unmoved by Aurangzeb's attempts to destroy him. Guru Gobind Singh calls on Aurangzeb to bring his army to the battlefield and he will bring his. He says there should be 3 kilometres between both armies. He says he will duel Aurangzeb and his 2 lieutenants at once.

Now, I do no trust in your oath, And I have not other alternative except drawing the sword… If you talk to me again, then I shall put you on the scared and straight path.

— Guru Gobind Singh, Fatehnama

== Comparison to the Zafarnama ==
Compared to Zafarnama, Fatehnama is similar to the later Zafarnama but is written in a harsher tone to the addressee. Although others say the style and language are not similar. The Fatehnama begins with an invocation to God similar to the Zafarnama. While Zafarnama’s focus on more on faith Fatehnama’s has a “militaristic ring” and “a touch of material triviality”. As opposed to Zafarnama Guru Gobind Singh taunts Aurangzeb in Fatehnama. In Fatehnama Guru Gobind Singh says, “You have tasted the fruits of comfort and pleasure You have not had encounters with fighting youngsters… You will be a wolf drenched by rain if I lay at your door[;} a lion [released] from its trap”. The tone does not match the tone in Zafarnama. This has led to some questions of the authorship.

== Resources ==
- The entire extant Fatehnama (in its original Persian, Gurmukhi transliteration, and English translation) can be downloaded from: link
