= Amin Sweeney =

Malaysian writer (1938–2010)

- Born: Patrick Louis Sweeney; 13 December 1938; England
- Died: 13 November 2010 (aged 71); Indonesia
- Spouse: Sastri Sunarti
- Children: Fauzia Maíre Sweeney, Abdul Mubin Sweeney, Maria Sweeney
- Writing career
- Language: Indonesian
- Notable works: A Full Hearing: Orality and Literacy in the Malay World (1987), Malay Word Music (1994), The Complete Works of Abdullah bin Abdul Kadir Munsyi (2005–2008)

Amin Sweeney (December 13, 1938 – 13 November 2010) was a Malay linguist of Anglo-Irish descent. He was primarily known as the author of three volumes of The Complete Works of Abdullah bin Abdul Kadir Munsyi and as the chief editor of the online literary journal Horizon Online, a prominent Indonesian literary magazine managed by Taufiq Ismail.

Amin Sweeney was born in England in 1938, and was sent by the British army to Malaya in 1958 to help stop the communist insurgency. Whilst in the army, he chose to live with the Malay soldiers and moved to Kluang from Melaka where he taught English. During his time as a lieutenant in the army, he taught himself Malay culture and Islamic studies. A year later he returned to London and converted to Islam in a London mosque.

Amin's interest in the Malay language and literature drove him to study at the University of London. In 1970, he completed his doctorate dissertation in Malay literature. He then became a lecturer and a professor at Universiti Kebangsaan Malaysia (1970–1977). Afterwards, he was an advisor for graduate and postgraduate programs, Chairman of the Department of South and Southeast Asian Studies (1986–1991) and a member of the Executive Committee of the Centre for Southeast Asia Studies (1991–1998) at the University of California, Berkeley, US, until he retired and became an emeritus professor in 1998.

Amin lived in Cibeureum, near Cipayung, Bogor, West Java, Indonesia up to his death. Sweeney married several times. His wife Sastri Sunarti, is an editor at Horizon Online and an expert in Indonesian; she was also the reason he moved to Jakarta. Sweeney had a daughter with Sastri, a son and a daughter from a previous marriage, and six grandchildren. When he died, he was in the process of becoming an Indonesian citizen from a Malaysian one.

== Selected written works ==
As a scholar, he wrote many monographs and books. Among them were Malay Shadow Puppets (London, 1972), The Ramayana and the Malay Shadow-Play (Kuala Lumpur, 1972), Studies in Malaysian Oral and Musical Tradition (with William P Malm, Ann Arbor, 1974), An International Seminar on the Shadow Plays of Asia (with Goto Akira, Tokyo, 1976), Reputations Live On: An Early Malay Autobiography (Berkeley, 1980), Authors and Audiences in Traditional Malay Literature (Berkeley, 1980), A Full Hearing: Orality and Literacy in the Malay World (Berkeley, 1987), Malay Word Music (Kuala Lumpur, Dewan Bahasa dan Pustaka, 1994), and Karya Lengkap Abdullah bin Abdul Kadir Munsyi (The Complete Works of Abdullah bin Abdul Kadir Munsyi, three volumes, Jakarta, 2005–2008).
