= Hikayat Muhammad Hanafiah =

Hikayat Muhammad Hanafiah (حكاية محمد حنفيه) is a Malay literary work that recounts the story of Muhammad ibn al-Hanafiyyah, half-brother of the martyrs of Shiism, Hasan and Husayn. The story revolves around the aftermath of the battle of Karbala and Muhammad’s role in an uprising against Yazid I, the caliph of the Umayyad Caliphate.

Hikayat Muhammad Hanafiah was one of the Hikayats mentioned in the Malay Annals read by Malay warriors to raise their fighting spirit during the siege of Malacca by the Portuguese Empire in 1511.

The following is an extract from the Malay Annals:

It was night and all the captains and young men were on guard in the palace. And the young men said, “Of what use is it for us to sit here in silence? It would be better for us to read some story of battle so that we might benefit from it.” “You are right,” said Tun Muhammad Unta. “Tun Indra Sagara had better go and ask for the story of Muhammad Hanafiah, saying that perhaps we may derive advantage from it, as the Feringgi (Portuguese) attack tomorrow.” Then Tun Indra Sagara went into the presence of Sultan and submitted their remark to his highness. And Sultan gave him the Hikayat Amir Hamzah, saying, “Tell them, I’d give them the story of Muhammad Hanafiah but I fear they’ll not be as brave as he: if they are like Amir Hamzah it will do, so I give them the story of Hamzah.” Tun Indra Sagara came out carrying the story of Hamzah and told them all Sultan had said, and they were silent not answering a word. Then, Tun Isak said to Tun Indra Sagara, “Tell his highness that he is mistaken. His highness must be like Muhammad Hanafiah and we like the captains of Baniar”. Tun Indra Sagara submitted Tun Isak’s remark to Sultan Ahmad, who smiled and answered, “He is right”. And he gave him the story of Muhammad Hanafiah too.

The text is known through at least 30 manuscripts and a lithographed edition in Singapore. Although the story is no longer popular today, it is extremely interesting in that it attests to a Shiite presence in the Malay world at the very beginning of Islamization.
