= Misa Melayu =

18th century Malay manuscript

- Manuscript MSS 6 of Misa Melayu

Misa Melayu (ميس ملايو) is a traditional Malay historical manuscript that narrates the history and ceremonial customs of the Perak Sultanate, particularly during the reign of Sultan Iskandar Dzulkarnain Shah (1750–1765) in the 18th century.

Written by the court historian, Raja Chulan ibni Raja Abdul Hamid ibni Yang di-Pertuan Muda Sultan Mansur Shah, it combines prose and poetry in Jawi script to document the genealogy of Perak's rulers, royal ceremonies, and important events, providing valuable insights into the political and cultural life of Perak at that time. The work is considered a significant piece of Malay historiography and literature, preserving the royal traditions and history of the Malay world.

In 2023, the Misa Melayu was listed on UNESCO's Memory of the World register.
