= Hikayat =

Genre of Malay and Sikh literature

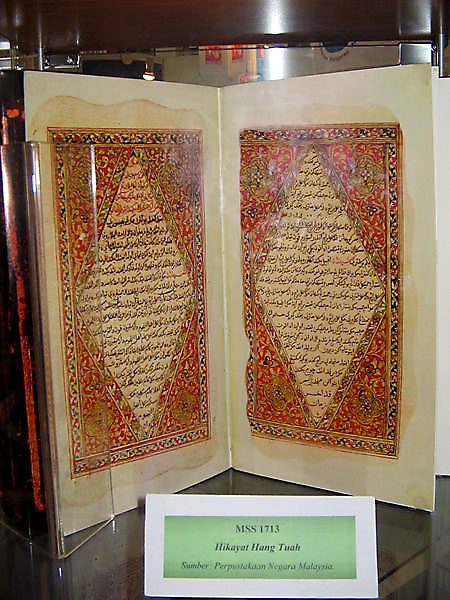
A copy of the Hang Tuah Saga in display.

Hikayat (Jawi: حكاية; Gurmukhi: ਹਿਕਾਇਤਾ, romanized: Hikā'itā) (or hikajat), which may be translated as "Romances", represent a genre of literature popular in Malay and Sikh literature and can be written in both verse and prose. Hikayat often mix past- and present-tense such that past events appear to be prophesied. Texts in this genre are meant to be publicly performed and are also often self-referential, in which they record examples of the recitation of other hikayat.

Malay hikayats relate the adventures of heroes from kingdoms across the Malay Archipelago (spanning modern Indonesia and Malaysia, especially in Sumatra) or chronicles of their royalty. The stories they contain, though based on history, are heavily romanticized. Poetical format is not required in Malay and Arabic Hikayat while the Acehnese Hikayat requires it. Hikayats also appear in Sikh literature of the Indian subcontinent, of which 11 or 12 are associated with Guru Gobind Singh. One famous example is the Hikaaitaan.

The Hikayat Muhammad Hanafiyyah, originating as a translation of a fourteenth-century Persian text, may be the oldest example of the hikayat genre. It is mentioned already in the oldest known list of Malay manuscripts from 1696 produced by Isaac de l'Ostal de Saint-Martin.

One common set of traditions which were frequently written into hikayat included literature in the tradition of the Alexander legends. These include the Hikayat Iskandar Zulkarnain ("The Story of Alexander the Two-Horned One"), the Hikayat Raja Iskandar ("The Story of King Alexander") and Hikayat Ya’juj wa-Ma’juj ("The Story of Gog and Magog").

The 16th–17th century Malay Hikajat Andakén Penurat, closely related to the Shair Kèn Tambuhan, tells the tragic story of the prince Raden Andakén Penurat and his beloved, Kèn Tambuhan. It is a short hikayat, distinguished by its psychological nature and is the forerunner of the modern romance novel.

== See also ==
- List of Hikayat
- Hikayat Hang Tuah
