= Hikayat Amir Hamzah =

Malay manuscript about Amir Hamzah

Hikayat Amir Hamzah (حكاية أمير حمزه) is a Malay literary work that chronicles the hero by the name Amir Hamzah. This book is one of the two hikayat mentioned in Sejarah Melayu as one of the hikayat used to encourage Malay warriors in their fight against invading Portuguese in Malacca in 1511.

The manuscripts were originally written in the classical Malay language on traditional paper in old Jawi script.

Hikayat Amir Hamzah was originally written by a Persian writer with title Qissa’i Emir Hamza or Hamzanama. It was translated into Arabic as Sirat al-Amir Hamzah.

Later, possibly in the fifteenth century, it was taken from India to Malacca (Melaka) during the Malacca Sultanate and translated into Malay in Jawi script. The Malay text, however, came directly from the Persian, particularly because it maintains the identity of Amir Hamzah as uncle of the Prophet. An edition in Latin script was published by A. Samad Ahmad, based on two texts in the Dewan Bahasa dan Pustaka collection.

Manuscripts are also found in other languages i.e., Javanese as the Serat Menak, Sundanese as Amir Hamjah, Bugis, Balinese, Acehnese, Turkish and Hindi. The story is performed in the Sasak shadow puppet theatre (wayang sasak), the Sundanese stick-puppet theatre (wayang golek) and in other traditional Indonesian performances.
