= Abdullah Abdul Kadir =

Malay author, translator and teacher (1796-1854)

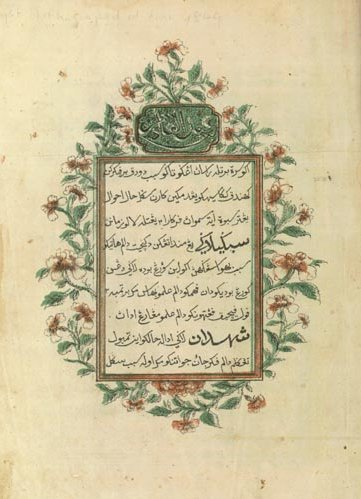
- A page of the Hikayat Abdullah written in Malay in the Jawi script, from the collection of the National Library of Singapore. A rare first edition, it was written between 1840 and 1843, printed by lithography, and published in 1849.
- Born: Abdullah bin Abdul Kadir; 1796; Malacca
- Died: 1854 (aged 57–58); Jeddah, Ottoman Empire
- Occupations: Author, translator and teacher
- Writing career
- Period: 19th century
- Genre: Non-fiction
- Subject: Early Malay history

Signature
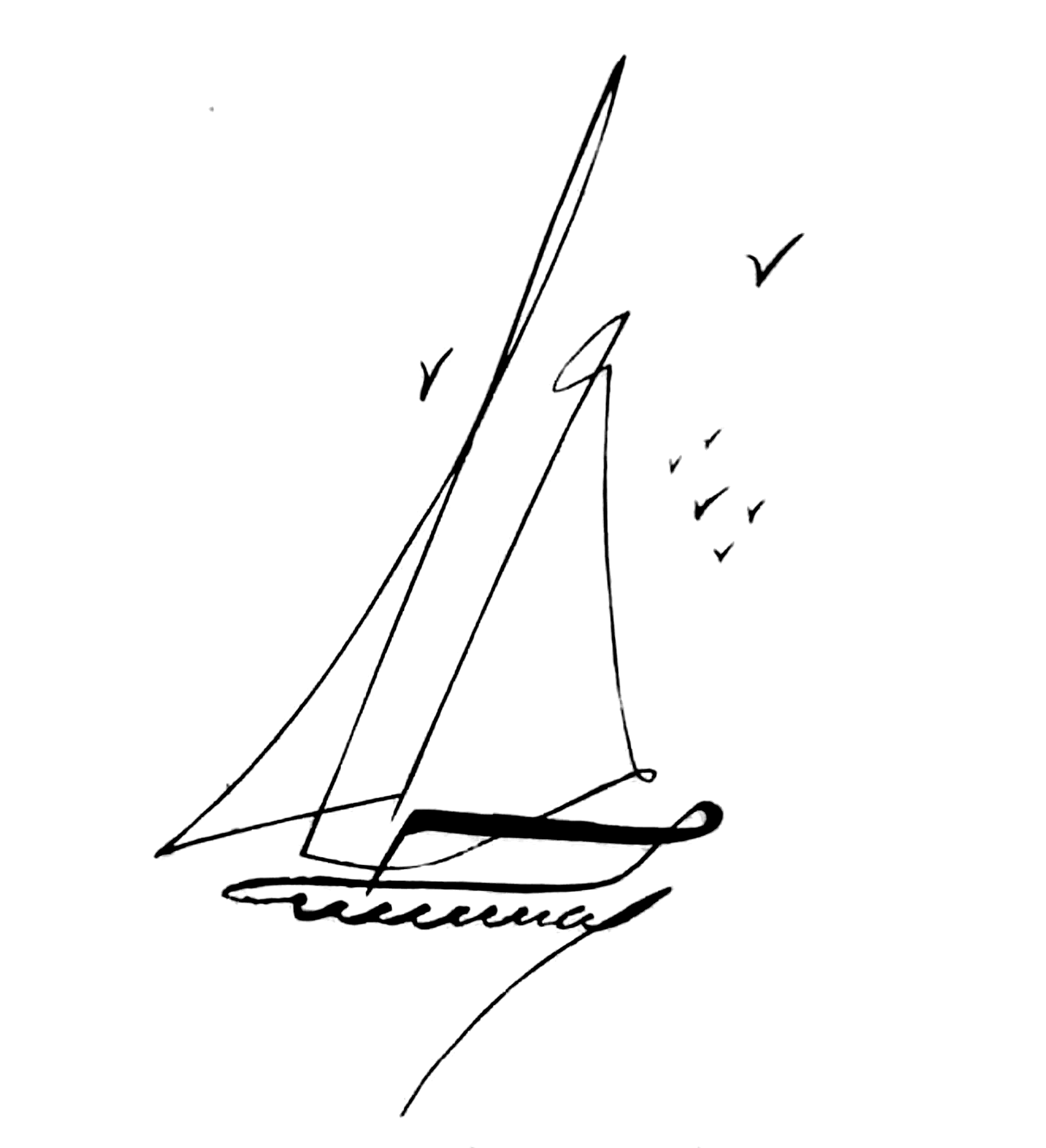

Abdullah bin Abdul al Kadir (1796–27 October 1854) (Arabic: عبد الله بن عبد القادر 'Abd Allāh bin 'Abd al-Qādir), also known as Munshi Abdullah, (Note: Munshi here refers to teacher or educator.) was a Malayan writer. He was a famous Malacca-born munshi of Singapore and died in Jeddah, then part of the Ottoman Empire.

Munshi Abdullah followed his father's career path as a translator and teacher of colonial officials in the Malay Archipelago, mainly the British and the Dutch. Munshi Abdullah has been popularly regarded as among the most cultured Malays who ever wrote, one of the greatest innovators in Malay letters and the father of modern Malay literature. He is also a useful source for historians on precolonial Malaya, offering a rare local perspective.

== Life ==
Munshi Abdullah was born in Kampung Pali (now renamed as Kampung Ketek) in Malacca City, from parents of Tamil and Yemeni descent. He was the youngest of five sons. All of his brothers died in infancy. He was sick most of the time and his mother took great care of him. As per the customary practices of the Malay community of that period, he was taken care of by various individuals as it was held that a child with poor immunity to diseases should be cared for by caretakers other than his or her biological parents. Munshi Abdullah was critical of the practice, as described in his autobiography Hikayat Abdullah.

He became a teacher or munshi, first by teaching Malay to the Indian soldiers of the Malacca Garrison. He then taught the Malay language to British and American missionaries and businessmen. He became a functionary in the Straits Settlements next. He became a scribe and copyist for Sir Stamford Raffles, followed by, in 1815, becoming translator of the Gospels and other text for the London Missionary Society. He also worked with the American Board of Missions.

Abdullah set sail for Mecca from Singapore in 1854 with the intention of completing the Hajj pilgrimage. He died of cholera shortly after his arrival in Mecca and before he could complete his pilgrimage, some time between May 8 and 18, 1854. He was 59 years old at the time of his death. The Kisah pelayaran Abdullah dari Singapura sampai ke Mekah (The story of Abdullah's voyage from Singapore to Mecca), one of Abdullah's lesser-known works, records his experiences on the journey to Mecca. There is some controversy over the exact time and location of his death, with some scholars arguing that he died in Jeddah in October 1854 at the age of 58, before reaching Mecca.

== Works ==
His writing career took off after a missionary, Alfred North, encouraged him to write an autobiography after reading Abdullah's account of a voyage along the east coast of Malaya. His most important works are the Hikayat Abdullah (an autobiography), Kisah Pelayaran Abdullah ke Kelantan (an account of his trip for the government to Kelantan), and Kisah Pelayaran Abdullah ke Mekah (a narrative of his pilgrimage to Mecca 1854). His work was an inspiration to future generations of writers and marks an early stage in the transition from classical Malay literature to modern Malay literature.

Hikayat Abdullah was the major literary work of Munshi Abdullah. It was completed in 1843 and first published in 1849, making it one of the first Malay literary texts to be published commercially. Abdullah's authorship was prominently displayed in this text and the contents were conveyed in simple, contemporary Malay. Unlike typical classical Malay literary works that contain fantasies and legendary stories, Abdullah's work was realistic. The book remains a reliable and accurate reference on early Malay history to this day.

=== Kerajaan ===
Abdullah was known as an ardent critic of the Malay political system of Kerajaan ("kingship"). His work, Kisah Pelayaran Abdullah ke Kelantan contained his advice to Malay rulers and comparisons he made between the British system of governing and that of Malay rulers.

Abdullah argued that the system of Kerajaan was detrimental to the Malay individual, as it was an impediment to the social improvement of the Malays. The Malay Sultan was deemed to be someone who was selfish, with no concern toward his subjects, to the extent they were treated like animals rather than humans. The idea of modernity and striving for excellence within the Malay community stemmed from his ideas and stinging criticisms of the ancient Malay polity of the Kerajaan. Under the Kerajaan, the Malays were deprived of education and hence they were easily oppressed. Without education, they did not have the ability to question the injustice meted out to them and could not take the initiative to institute changes to improve their lives.

Some of his writings show the criticism levelled at the Kerajaan system. In one instance, after meeting and then following Raffles from Malacca to the newly established Singapore, Abdullah witnessed and criticized the dealings of the ruler's men, mentioning the lack of safety, such as daylight robberies, house robberies, stabbings and burning of houses. The Temenggong's men went fully armed and started brawls with men from Malacca and only with the presence of resident William Farquhar was further bloodshed avoided. Abdullah also commented on the attitudes common among the 'anak raja' during his 1837 visit to Pahang and Terengganu, mentioning their lack of education, opium addiction, gambling and cockfighting.

Although the condemnation may be exaggerated, Munshi Abdullah's allegations were not without basis. He is regarded by some to be the first Malayan journalist, taking Malay literature out of its preoccupation with folk-stories and legends into accurate historical descriptions.

== Ethnicity ==
Munshi Abdullah was a great-grandson of a Hadhrami Arab trader, and also had Indian Tamil and to a smaller extent.

J.T. Thomson, a contemporary of Abdullah, described him thus: "In physiognomy he was a Tamilian of southern Hindustan: slightly bent forward, spare, energetic, bronze in complexion, oval-faced, high-nosed, one eye squinting outwards a little. He dressed in the usual style of Malacca Tamils. Acheen seluar, check sarong, printed baju, square skull cap and sandals. He had the vigour and pride of the Arab, the perseverance and subtlety of the Hindoo - in language and national sympathy only was he a Malay."

== Legacy ==
A statue of him was erected alongside several local Singaporean figures in Raffles' Landing near the Singapore River to commemorate the bicentennial establishing of modern Singapore in 2019.

=== Places named after him ===
- Jalan Munshi Abdullah in downtown Kuala Lumpur, in the Dang Wangi ward near Jalan Tuanku Abdul Rahman and Masjid Jamek. This road connects Jalan Ampang to Jalan Dang Wangi.
- Jalan Munshi Abdullah (formerly Newcome Road) in the historical core of Melaka, part of Malaysia Federal Route 5.
- Munshi Abdullah Avenue and Munshi Abdullah Walk in a residential area dubbed "Teachers' Estate" near Upper Thomson Road, Singapore.
- Jalan Munshi Abdullah in the residential area of Taman Abidin, Jelutong district, George Town, Penang.
