= Kawi (Unicode block) =

- Range: U+11F00..U+11F5F (96 code points)
- Plane: SMP
- Scripts: Kawi
- Assigned: 87 code points
- Unused: 9 reserved code points

Unicode version history
- 15.0 (2022): 86 (+86)
- 16.0 (2024): 87 (+1)

Unicode documentation
- Code chart ∣ Web page

Kawi is a Unicode block containing characters for Kawi script. The script was used historically in insular Southeast Asia to write the Old Javanese, Sanskrit, Old Malay, Old Balinese, and Old Sundanese languages.

== Block ==
Kawi^{[1]}^{[2]} Official Unicode Consortium code chart (PDF)
	0	1	2	3	4	5	6	7	8	9	A	B	C	D	E	F
U+11F0x	𑼀	𑼁	𑼂	𑼃	𑼄	𑼅	𑼆	𑼇	𑼈	𑼉	𑼊	𑼋	𑼌	𑼍	𑼎	𑼏
U+11F1x	𑼐		𑼒	𑼓	𑼔	𑼕	𑼖	𑼗	𑼘	𑼙	𑼚	𑼛	𑼜	𑼝	𑼞	𑼟
U+11F2x	𑼠	𑼡	𑼢	𑼣	𑼤	𑼥	𑼦	𑼧	𑼨	𑼩	𑼪	𑼫	𑼬	𑼭	𑼮	𑼯
U+11F3x	𑼰	𑼱	𑼲	𑼳	𑼴	𑼵	𑼶	𑼷	𑼸	𑼹	𑼺				𑼾	𑼿
U+11F4x	𑽀	𑽁	𑽂	𑽃	𑽄	𑽅	𑽆	𑽇	𑽈	𑽉	𑽊	𑽋	𑽌	𑽍	𑽎	𑽏
U+11F5x	𑽐	𑽑	𑽒	𑽓	𑽔	𑽕	𑽖	𑽗	𑽘	𑽙	𑽚					
Notes: 1. As of Unicode version 16.0; 2. Grey areas indicate non-assigned code points

== History ==
The following Unicode-related documents record the purpose and process of defining specific characters in the Kawi block:

Version	Final code points (Note: Proposed code points and characters names may differ from final code points and names)	Count	L2 ID	WG2 ID	Document
15.0	U+11F00..11F10, 11F12..11F3A, 11F3E..11F59	86	L2/12-125	N4266	Pandey, Anshuman (2012-04-25), Preliminary Proposal to Encode the Kawi Script
15.0	U+11F00..11F10, 11F12..11F3A, 11F3E..11F59	86	L2/12-147		Anderson, Deborah; McGowan, Rick; Whistler, Ken (2012-04-25), "XI. KAWI", Review of Indic-related L2 documents and Recommendations to the UTC
15.0	U+11F00..11F10, 11F12..11F3A, 11F3E..11F59	86	L2/12-167		Ganesan, Naga (2012-05-03), Comment on L2/12-125: Encoding Model for Kawi Script
15.0	U+11F00..11F10, 11F12..11F3A, 11F3E..11F59	86	L2/13-028		Anderson, Deborah; McGowan, Rick; Whistler, Ken; Pournader, Roozbeh (2013-01-28), "22", Recommendations to UTC on Script Proposals
15.0	U+11F00..11F10, 11F12..11F3A, 11F3E..11F59	86	L2/20-256		Perdana, Aditya Bayu; Nurwansah, Ilham (2020-09-30), Preliminary Proposal to encode Kawi
15.0	U+11F00..11F10, 11F12..11F3A, 11F3E..11F59	86	L2/20-250		Anderson, Deborah; Whistler, Ken; Pournader, Roozbeh; Moore, Lisa; Constable, Peter; Liang, Hai (2020-10-01), "15. Kawi", Recommendations to UTC #165 October 2020 on Script Proposals
15.0	U+11F00..11F10, 11F12..11F3A, 11F3E..11F59	86	L2/21-026		Sinclair, Iain (2020-11-17), Comments on Kawi, L2/20-256
15.0	U+11F00..11F10, 11F12..11F3A, 11F3E..11F59	86	L2/20-283		Lindenberg, Norbert (2020-12-06), Repha representation for Kawi
15.0	U+11F00..11F10, 11F12..11F3A, 11F3E..11F59	86	L2/20-287		Syarifuddin, M. Mahali (2020-12-08), Comments on L2/20-284 regarding disunificaton of KAWI VOWEL SIGN AA
15.0	U+11F00..11F10, 11F12..11F3A, 11F3E..11F59	86	L2/20-284R		Perdana, Aditya Bayu; Nurwansah, Ilham (2020-12-22), Proposal to encode Kawi (revised)
15.0	U+11F00..11F10, 11F12..11F3A, 11F3E..11F59	86	L2/21-016R		Anderson, Deborah; Whistler, Ken; Pournader, Roozbeh; Moore, Lisa; Liang, Hai (2021-01-14), "18. Kawi", Recommendations to UTC #166 January 2021 on Script Proposals
15.0	U+11F00..11F10, 11F12..11F3A, 11F3E..11F59	86	L2/21-009		Moore, Lisa (2021-01-27), "Consensus 166-C30", UTC #166 Minutes
15.0	U+11F00..11F10, 11F12..11F3A, 11F3E..11F59	86	L2/21-048		Perdana, Aditya Bayu; Lindenberg, Norbert (2021-02-16), Reply to 'On the Kawi Space Filler and the Names of Punctuation Characters'
15.0	U+11F00..11F10, 11F12..11F3A, 11F3E..11F59	86	L2/21-073		Anderson, Deborah; Whistler, Ken; Pournader, Roozbeh; Moore, Lisa; Liang, Hai (2021-04-23), "Kawi", Recommendations to UTC #167 April 2021 on Script Proposals
15.0	U+11F00..11F10, 11F12..11F3A, 11F3E..11F59	86	L2/21-176		Syarifuddin, M. Mahali (2021-07-30), Proposal to Unencode KAWI VOWEL SIGN VOCALIC L
15.0	U+11F00..11F10, 11F12..11F3A, 11F3E..11F59	86	L2/21-180		Perdana, Aditya Bayu; Nurwansah, Ilham (2021-09-23), Note on Kawi Sign Vocalic L U+11F3C and Possible Cognate of U+1B00
15.0	U+11F00..11F10, 11F12..11F3A, 11F3E..11F59	86	L2/21-174		Anderson, Deborah; Whistler, Ken; Pournader, Roozbeh; Liang, Hai (2021-10-01), "12. Kawi", Recommendations to UTC #169 October 2021 on Script Proposals
15.0	U+11F00..11F10, 11F12..11F3A, 11F3E..11F59	86	L2/21-167		Cummings, Craig (2022-01-27), "Consensus 169-C15", Approved Minutes of UTC Meeting 169
15.0	U+11F00..11F10, 11F12..11F3A, 11F3E..11F59	86	L2/22-056		Silva, Eduardo Marín (2022-03-05), "Kawi", Review of the code charts of Unicode 15 Alpha (PRI 442)
15.0	U+11F00..11F10, 11F12..11F3A, 11F3E..11F59	86	L2/22-093		Kinaṇṭi, Waṣkiṭa; Sh., Rikza F. (2022-03-21), Review of Kawi code chart of Unicode 15 Alpha (PRI 442)
15.0	U+11F00..11F10, 11F12..11F3A, 11F3E..11F59	86	L2/22-068		Anderson, Deborah; Whistler, Ken; Pournader, Roozbeh; Constable, Peter (2022-04-15), "19. Kawi Name Change and Annotation, 20. Kawi Review of Code Chart for 15.0", Recommendations to UTC #171 April 2022 on Script Proposals
15.0	U+11F00..11F10, 11F12..11F3A, 11F3E..11F59	86	L2/22-080R2		Lindenberg, Norbert; et al. (2022-08-22), Line breaking at orthographic syllable boundaries
15.0	U+11F00..11F10, 11F12..11F3A, 11F3E..11F59	86	L2/22-061		Constable, Peter (2022-07-27), "D.1 Section 18, D.1 Section 19, D.1 Section 20, D.2", Approved Minutes of UTC Meeting 171
16.0	U+11F5A	1	L2/22-093		Kinaṇṭi, Waṣkiṭa; Sh., Rikza F. (2022-03-21), "POSSIBILITY OF OTHER UNPROPOSED CHARACTERS", Review of Kawi code chart of Unicode 15 Alpha (PRI 442)
16.0	U+11F5A	1	L2/22-236		Nasrullah, Febri Muhammad (2022-10-15), Proposal to encode KAWI SIGN NUKTA
16.0	U+11F5A	1	L2/22-248		Anderson, Deborah; et al. (2022-10-31), "8 Kawi", Recommendations to UTC #173 October 2022 on Script Proposals
16.0	U+11F5A	1	L2/22-241		Constable, Peter (2022-11-09), "Consensus 173-C28", Approved Minutes of UTC Meeting 173, "Accept U+11F5A KAWI SIGN NUKTA"
