= OMY =

OMY or omy may refer to:

- Ōmiya Station (Saitama), JR East station code
- ISO 639:omy, the ISO 639 code for the Old Malay
