= Kawi script =

Old Javanese script

Akṣara Kawi 𑼄𑼒𑽂𑼰𑼬𑼒𑼮𑼶
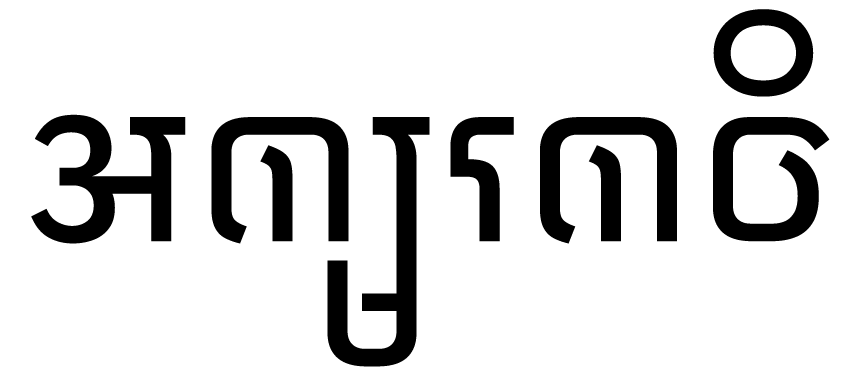
- Script type: Abugida
- Period: c. 8th–16th century
- Direction: Left-to-right
- Languages: Old Balinese, Old Javanese, Old Malay, Old Sundanese, Old Tagalog, Sanskrit

Related scripts
- Parent systems: Egyptian hieroglyphs: Proto-Sinaitic; Phoenician; Aramaic; Brahmi; Tamil-Brahmi; Pallava; Akṣara Kawi
- Child systems: In Indonesia: Balinese; Batak; Javanese; Lontara; Sundanese; Rencong; Rejang; Buda; In the Philippines: Baybayin scripts
- Sister systems: Khmer, Cham, Old Mon, Grantha, Tamil

ISO 15924
- ISO 15924: Kawi (368), Kawi

Unicode
- Unicode alias: Kawi
- Unicode range: U+11F00–U+11F5F

The Kawi script or the Old Javanese script is a historic Brahmic script used across Maritime Southeast Asia between the 8th century and the 16th century. The Kawi corpus is especially abundant in Java, but materials in Kawi have also been found in Sumatra, the Malay Peninsula, Bali, Thailand, and the Philippines. The script is frequently used to write the Old Javanese language, but whole texts (or parts thereof) in Sanskrit, Old Malay, Old Balinese, Old Sundanese, and Old Khmer have also been found written in the Kawi script.

== History ==
The Kawi script gradually evolved from the 'Pallava' script (or 'Late Southern Brāhmī') (Note: Epigrapher Arlo Griffiths argues that the name 'Pallava' is misleading as varieties of the script is not always related to the Pallava dynasty.) which were dispersed to maritime Southeast Asia in multiple waves from southern India since around the 4th century CE. (Note: Examples of Southeast Asian 'Pallava' includes the Đông Yên Châu inscription (c. 350 CE), Yūpa inscriptions (c. 4th century CE), and Ciaruteun inscription (c. 5th century CE)) The Kawi script tend to be more cursive than the lithic 'Pallava' script and shows more pronounced features of palm leaf writing techniques. From the mid-8th century, plain but functional Kawi was widely used for chancery documents such as land grants and royal edicts. Towards the end of the first millennium, more calligraphic Kawi variations emerged in conjunction with the development of Old Javanese literary tradition, especially the kakawin genre. As Kawi use spread, it developed many stylistic variants and came to be used for texts in multiple languages. Specimens has been found as far away as Thailand (e.g. Grahi inscription for writing Old Khmer) (Note: Although in this instance the Kawi script is termed as 'Old Sumatran.') and the Philippines (e.g. Laguna Copperplate Inscription for writing Old Malay). After the 16th century, the various forms of Kawi further diverged into many distinct scripts of maritime Southeast Asia such as Balinese, Batak, Baybayin, Javanese, Lontara, and others.

== Characteristics ==
The Kawi script is an abugida with fairly standard features of a Brahmi derived script:

- Each consonant has an inherent vowel of short /a/ (e.g. 𑼒 /ka/)
- Each consonant has a dependent conjunct form which is used to write consonant clusters (e.g. 𑼒 /ka/ → 𑼒𑽂𑼒 /kka/, 𑼫 /ya/ → 𑼒𑽂𑼫 /kya/).
- Each vowel has two forms, independent character (e.g. 𑼆 /i/) and dependent diacritic (e.g. ◌𑼶 /-i/). Dependent vowel diacritics are used to modify the inherent vowel of a consonant (e.g. 𑼒 /ka/ → 𑼒𑼶 /ki/).
- Absence of vowel is indicated with a diacritic known in Sanskrit as a virama/halanta (e.g. 𑼒 /ka/ → 𑼒𑽁 /k/).
- Nasalization and aspiration are noted by separate diacritics, known in Sanskrit as candrabindu (◌𑼀), anusvara (◌𑼁), and visarga (◌𑼃) (Note: Special visarga forms jihvāmūlīya and upadhmānīya are attested in at least one Kawi specimen dated to the 9th century, the Watu Genuk inscription, although they have not been attested beyond this single instance.) respectively.
- Numerals (with positional notation and decimal base) and punctuation are regularly attested.
- Nukta diacritic (◌𑽚), used to indicate foreign pronunciation beyond the Indic repertoire, started to appear in some late Kawi varieties.
- Texts are written left to right in scriptio continua, although a number of decorative texts are written in a unique bottom to top vertical direction.

Some idiosyncratic characteristics of Kawi script (which are often more apparent in non-Sanskrit texts) include:

- Presence of dependent vowel diacritics to represent short mid central vowel /ə/ (◌𑽀) and long counterpart /əː/ (◌𑽀𑼴). These diacritics are not present in the original Sanskrit system, but cognates of these diacritics are present in several scripts descended from Kawi.
- Usage of anusvara and visarga are often simplified so that they represent final /-ŋ/ and /-h/ respectively.
- Particularly in late varieties of Kawi, the repha diacritic (𑼂) which originally represents cluster initial /r-/ is reanalyzed as cluster final /-r/.
- Non-Sanskrit texts are prone to use long vowel diacritics erratically without apparent effect on pronunciation. This is due to the lack of short-long vowel distinction in most native languages of the Malay Archipelago.

== Styles ==
Over a period of use that spans 800 years, the Kawi script exhibit a wide range of stylistic variations. The ‘standard’ plain form of early Kawi is seen in specimens from the reign of Lokapāla/Kayuwangi (855–885 CE) and Balitung (898–910 CE). Dutch epigrapher Johannes Gijsbertus de Casparis categorized later versions into four styles: Kawi from the reign of Mpu Daksa (c. 910–918 CE), Airlangga (c. 1020–1052 CE), and finally the ‘normal’ and decorative ‘Quadratic script’ from the Kadiri period (c.1100–1222).

However, it must be noted that terms and definitions for the styles of Kawi may be partly inaccurate or inconsistent between sources, which is a common problem in the scholarship of pre-modern Southeast Asian scripts. For example, while De Casparis relates the Quadratic style of Kawi with the Kadiri period, more recent research noted that there are numerous Quadratic Kawi samples preceding and proceeding this period, making the Kadiri association somewhat erroneous. Another example is a particular style of Kawi common in inked gebang manuscripts from 14th to 16th century West Java, sometimes known as “Buda Script.” Scholars unsatisfied with the vagueness of the term "Buda" has also referred the script as “Quadrate Old Javanese,” “Bold Semi-cursive Script of West Java,” and “Old (West) Javanese Quadratic.”

== Corpus ==
The Kawi script was used in a wide range of materials. Comprehensive catalogue of all attestations is not available, although there are numerous catalogues covering regions where Kawi corpus is especially abundant, such as Sumatra, Java, and Bali.

=== Inscriptions ===
Inscriptions with Kawi script

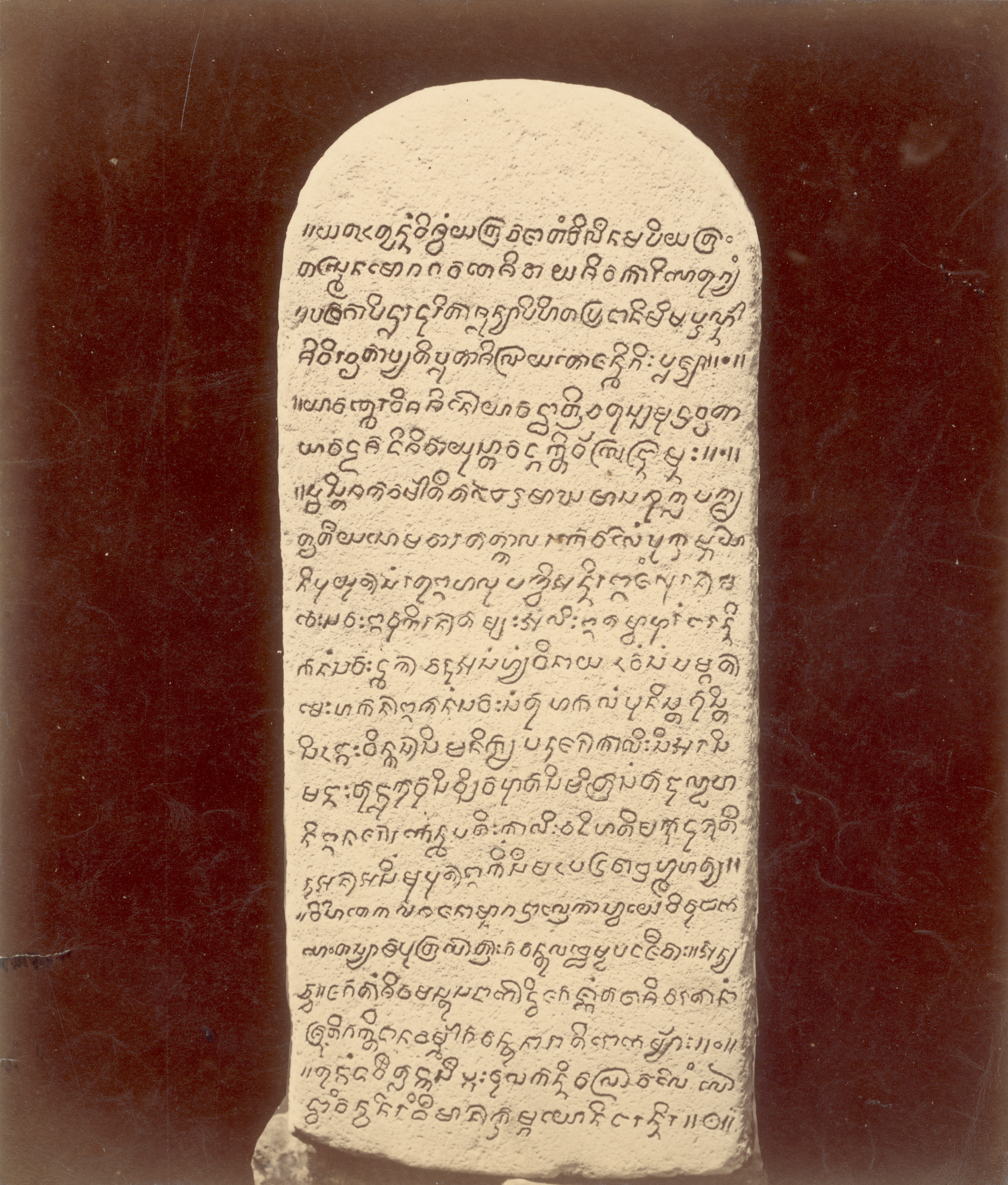
Wukiran/Pereng inscription (785 Śaka/863 CE) from Yogyakarta, Indonesia in plain, early Kawi.

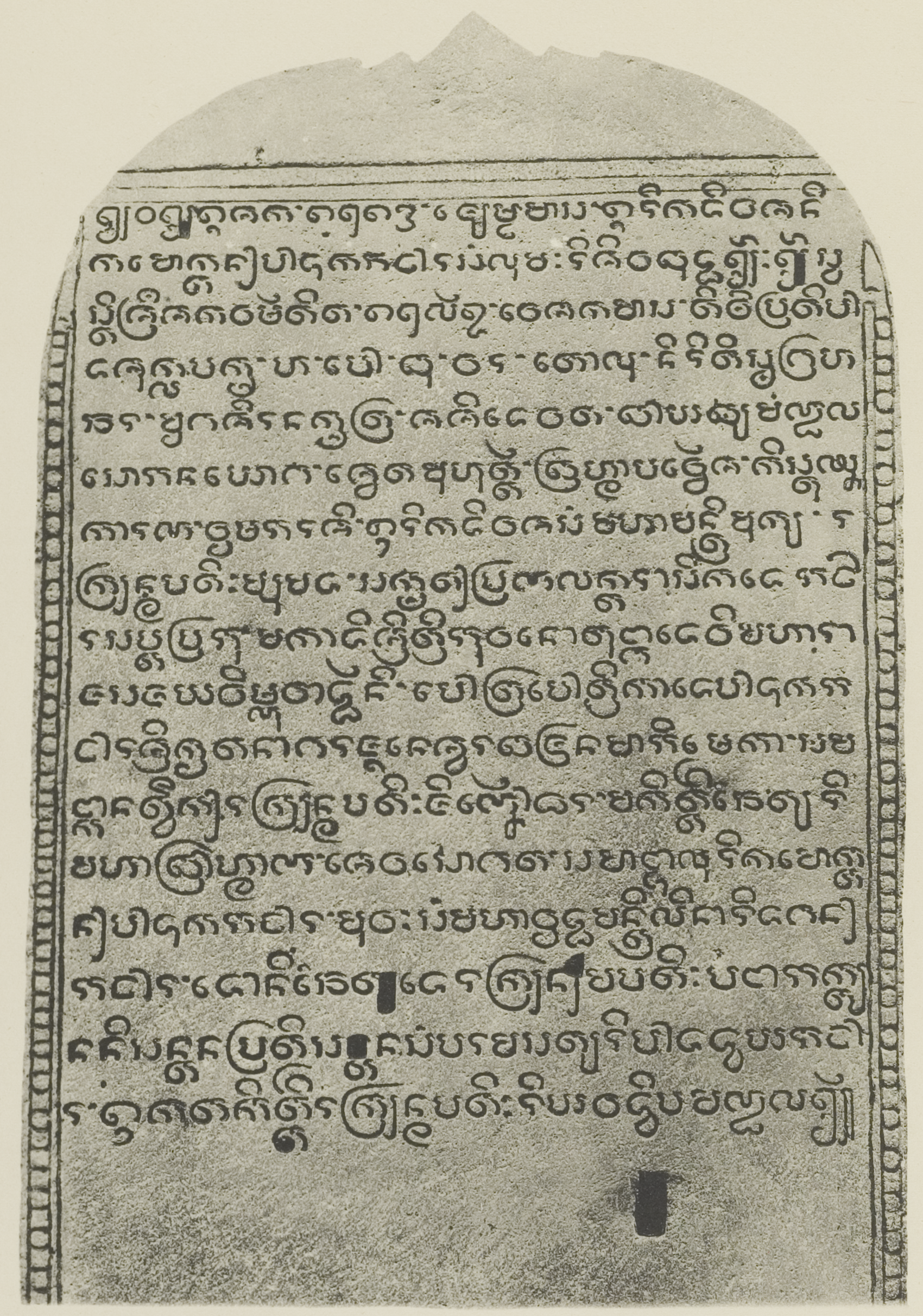
Gajah Mada inscription (1273 Śaka/1351 CE) from central Java, Indonesia.

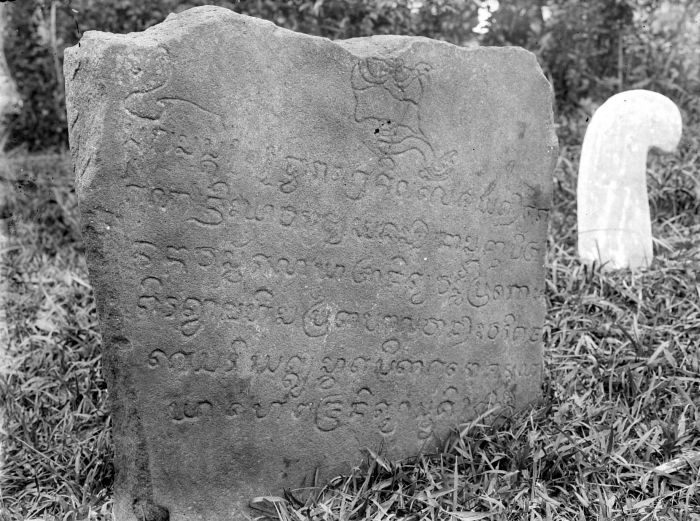
Saruaso II inscription (14th century CE), from west Sumatra, Indonesia.

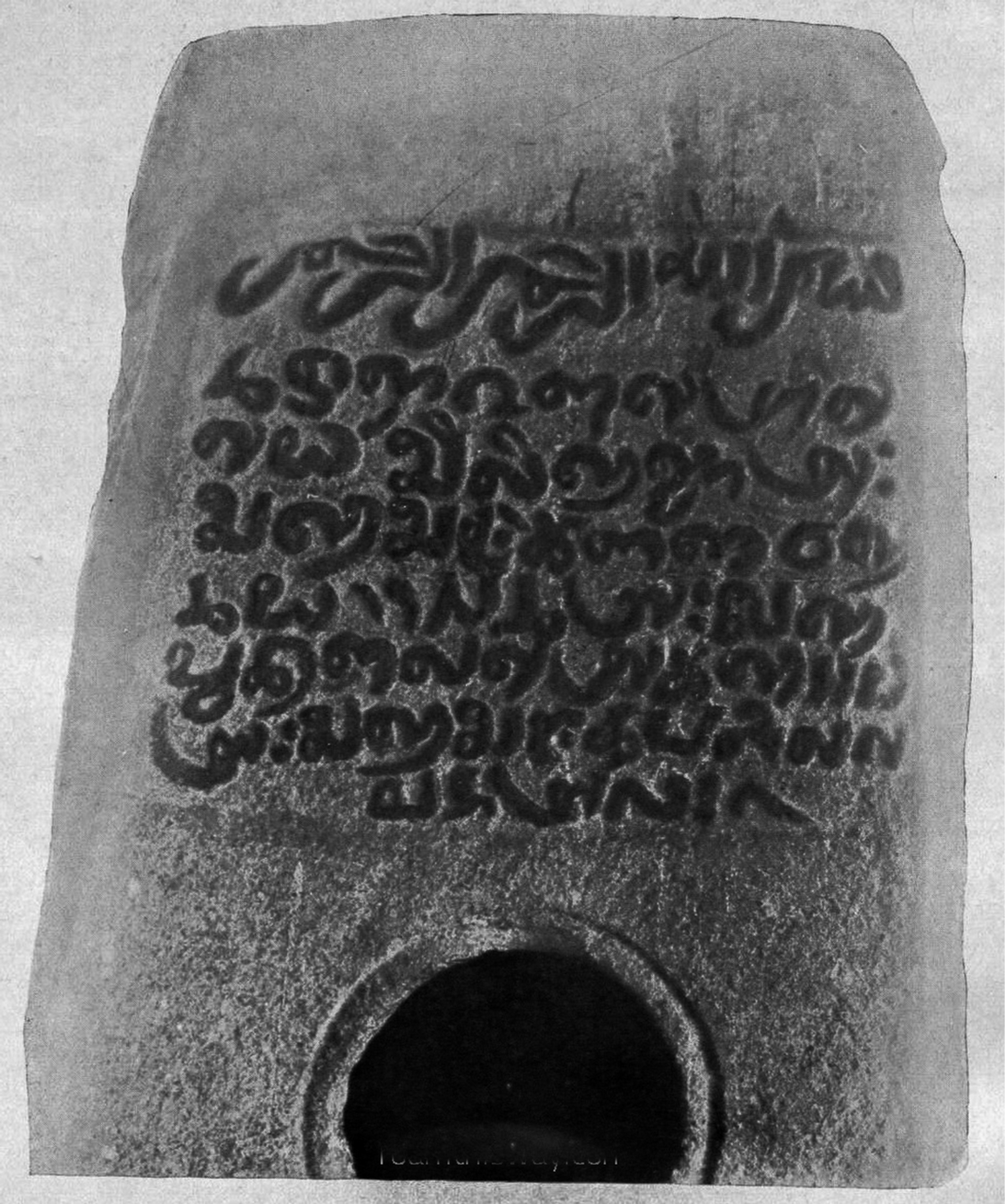
Ahmat Majanu tombstone (1467 CE) from Pengkalan Kempas Historical Complex, Malaysia.

Rock inscription in Telaga Warna, Dieng plateau

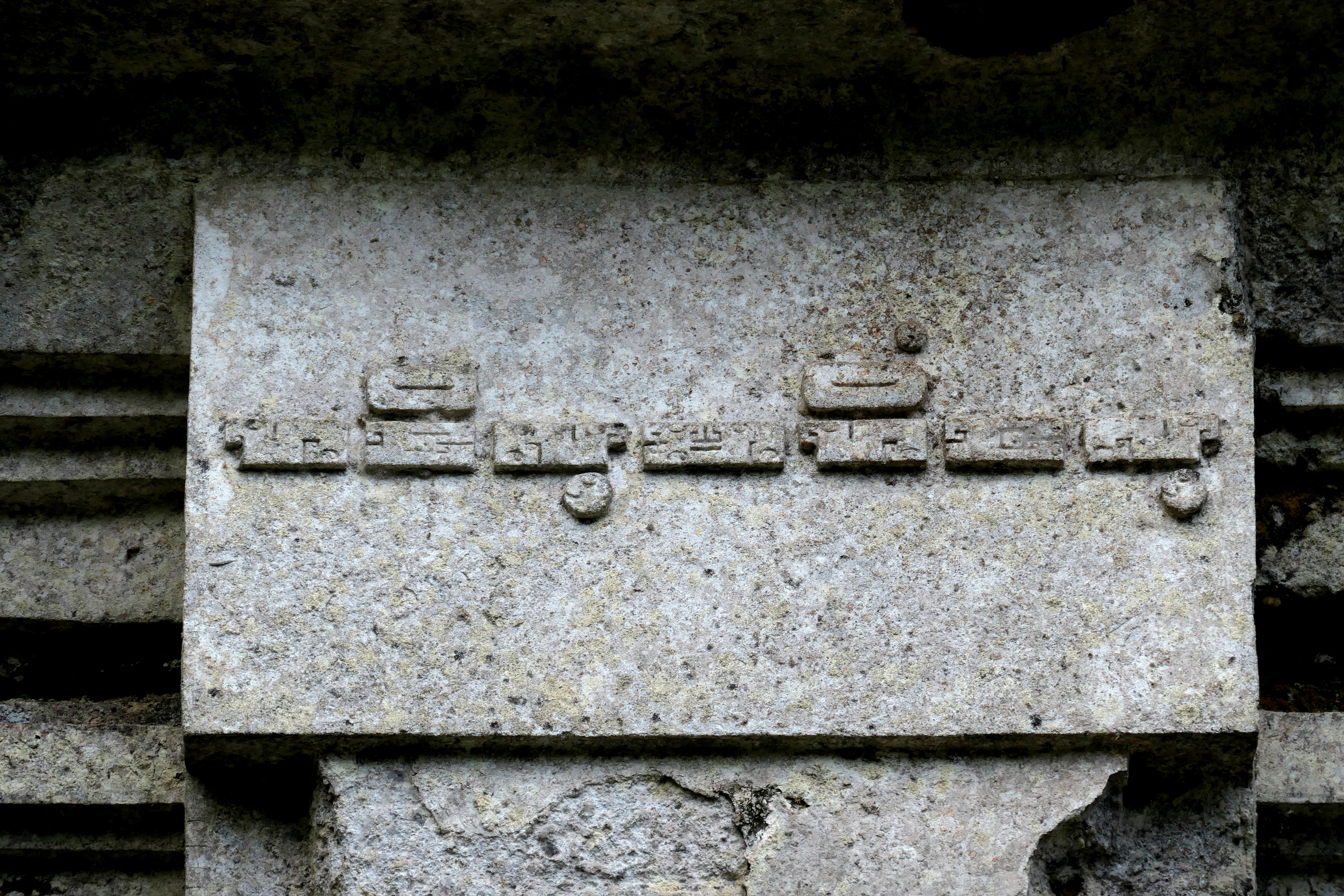
Architectural inscription in Gunung Kawi complex, Bali, in quadratic Kawi which reads 𑼲𑼙𑼶𑼭𑼸𑼪𑼲𑼶𑼁𑼙𑼭𑼸 haji lumahiṃ jalu.

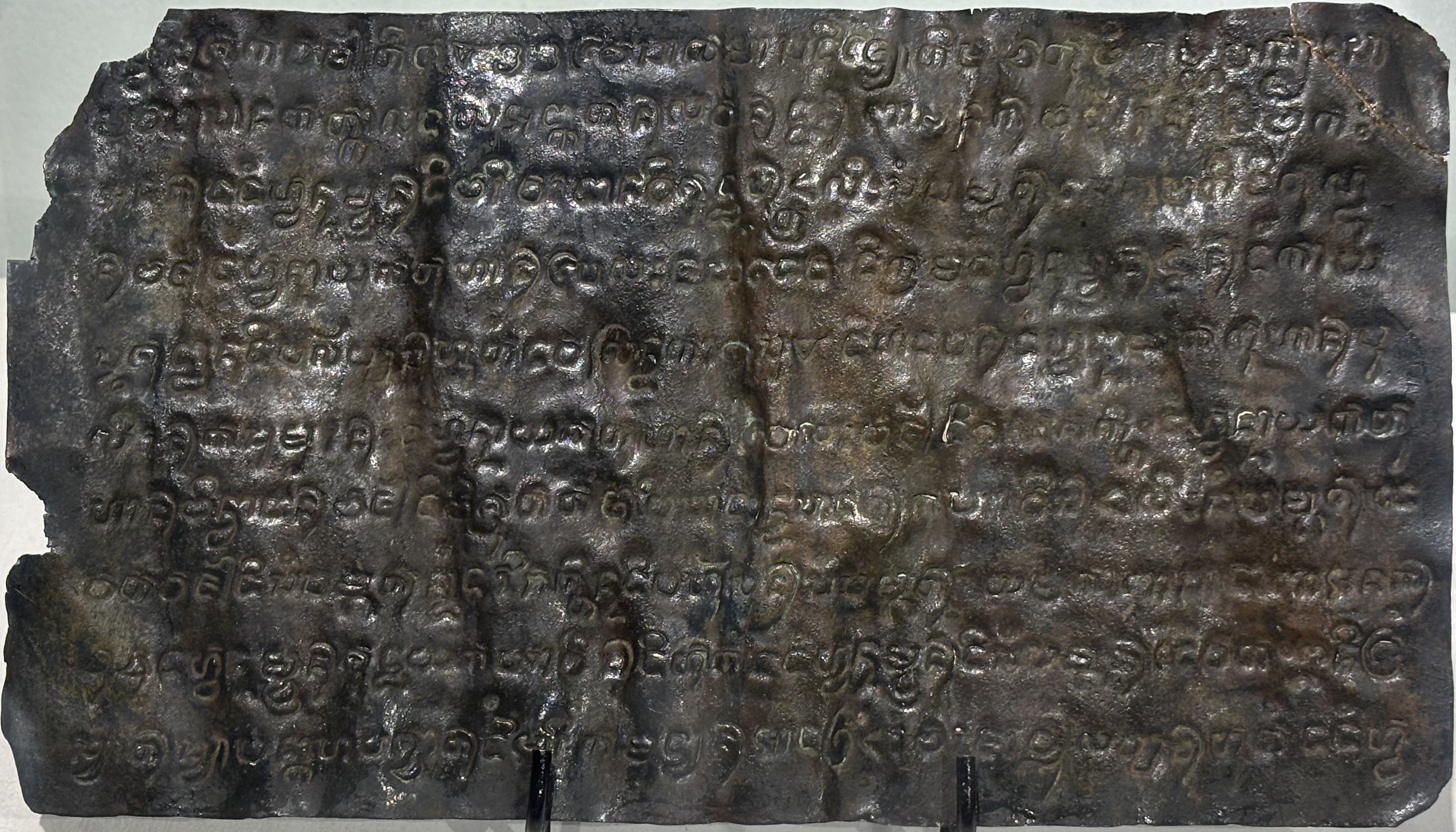
Laguna Copperplate Inscription (822 Śaka/900 CE) from Luzon, the Philippines.

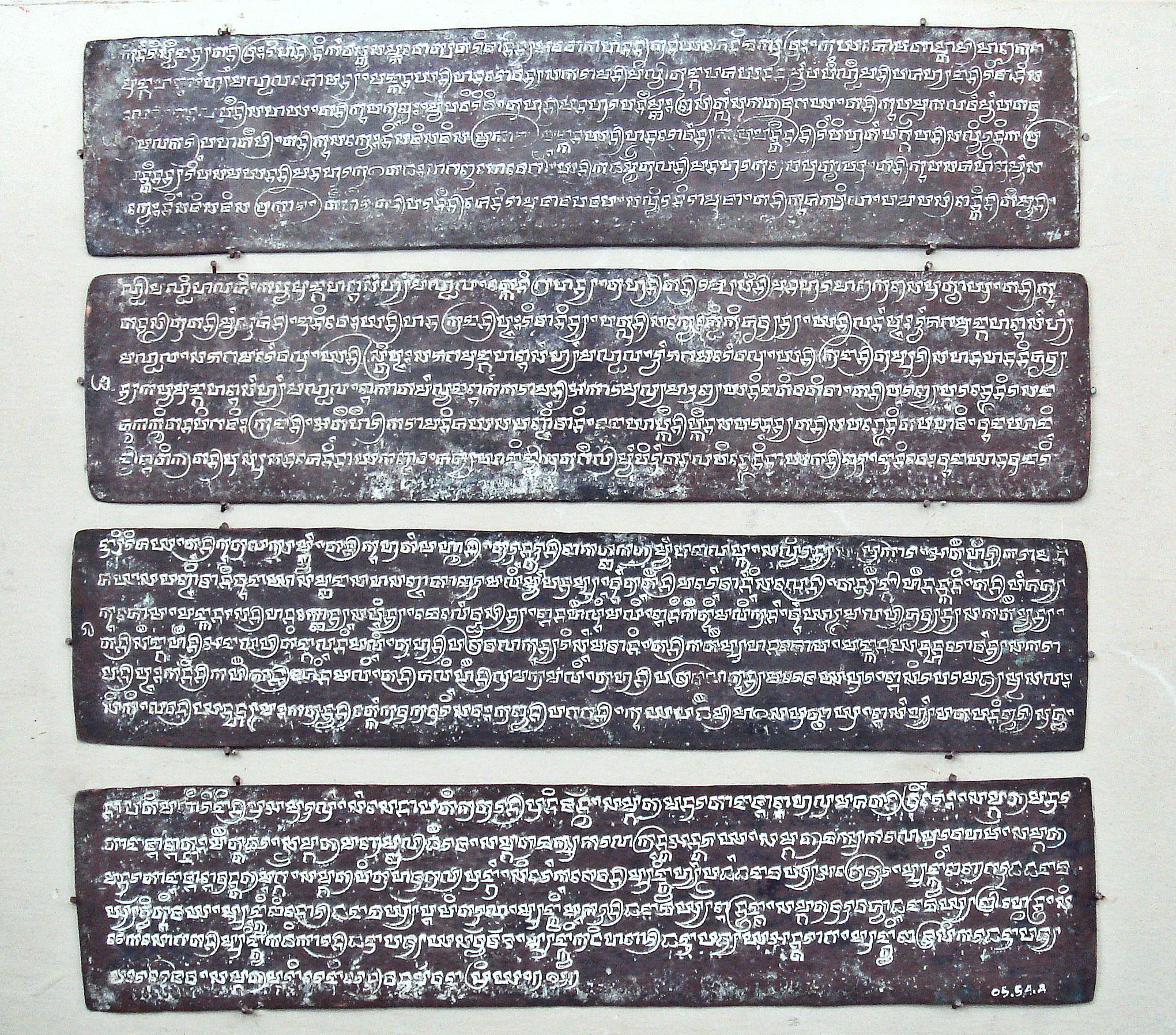
Copper plate inscriptions of king Jayapangus regarding the village border in Kintamani Bangli, Bali (12th century).

Stone inscriptions form the bulk of Kawi corpus, from the earliest known Kawi examples such as in the Kesongo stone (685 Śaka/763 CE), (Note: Found around 2004-2005 near the Salatiga-Tuntang-Bawen road, in desa Kesongo, kecamatan Tuntang, kabupaten Semarang, Central Java. Now kept in Museum Ronggowarsito, Semarang (inv. no. 04.1135). The inscription only has brief date śrī 685 Asuji 𑼯𑽂𑼬𑼷𑽖𑽘𑽕𑼄𑼱𑼸𑼙𑼶, but the month name asuji is characteristic of Old Javanese language.) and the Disunuh inscription (709 Śaka/787 CE), (Note: Discovered by a stone collector named Wardi in 2018 in the desa Kataan, kecamatan Ngadirejo, kabupaten Temanggung, Central Java.) to late Kawi varieties such as in Minye Tujoh inscription from Aceh (1380 CE), and Ahmat Majanu tombstone from Pangkalan Kempas, Malaysia (1467 CE). Some inscriptions are carved into buildings, such as the brief captions in the Karmavibhangga reliefs of Borobudur. Inscription on plates or foils from a variety of metals (including lead-bronze, copper, and gold) also form the bulk of Kawi corpus. The vast majority of plates found in Java and Bali are chancery documents or sīma charters, which are endowment records of tax-exempted land (sīma) made by representatives of the state (typically a king) to individual or collective beneficiaries. Beside chancery texts, religious formulas and curses have also been found in metal inscriptions. The oldest plate specimen known thus far is the Munduan inscription dated to 807 CE. A notable plate specimen known as Laguna Copperplate Inscription, dated to 822 Śaka/900 CE, is the earliest-known written document found in the Philippines. The inscription records an acquittal of debt between a certain 𑼥𑼪𑽂𑼮𑽂𑼬𑼥𑽁 Namvaran and the 𑼱𑼾𑼥𑼴𑼦𑼡𑼶 senapati (duke) of Tondo. It is written in Old Malay language with numerous terms in Sanskrit, Old Javanese, and Old Tagalog.

=== Manuscripts ===
Manuscripts in Kawi script

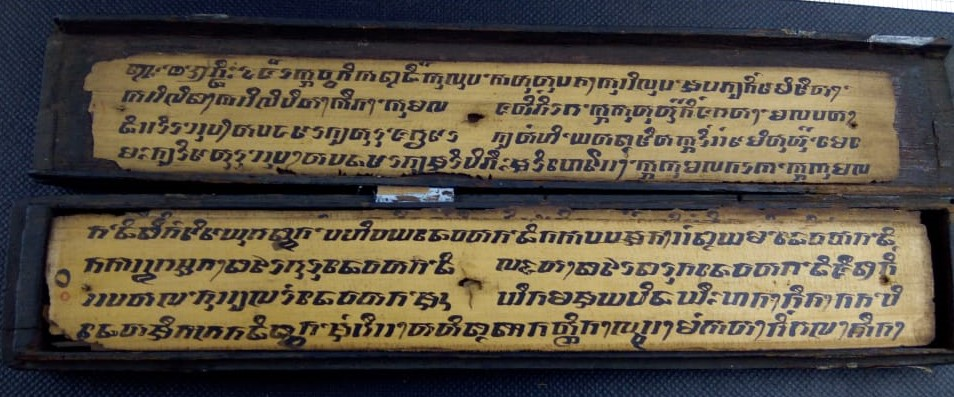
Gebang manuscript with Sanghyang Raga Dewata text from west Java, Indonesia.

A small number of late Kawi texts have survived in manuscriptal artifacts. A notable specimen from Sumatra is the Tanjung Tanah manuscript or the Nītisārasamuccaya, (Note: Tanjung Tanah is the name of the village in Kerinci regency, Jambi province, Indonesia where the manuscript is preserved. Nītisārasamuccaya is the name mentioned within the manuscript's text.) the oldest extant Malay code of laws dated to 1379–1387 CE. (Note: The Nītisārasamuccaya’s inscribed date has faded, but its age range was narrowed through carbon dating and partial reading offered by Thomas Hunter.) In Java, there are two sites where sizable collection of late Kawi manuscripts have been preserved. The first site is on the slopes of Mount Merapi-Merbabu, which mostly preserved lontar manuscripts. Titles found in this collection include Darmawarsa and Gita Sinangsaya. The second site is in the hinterlands of West Java, which mostly preserved gebang manuscripts written with ink in a distinctive quadratic Kawi style. Titles found in this collection include Sanghyang Siksa Kandang Karesian, Dharma Patañjala, Kakawin Arjunawiwaha, and Kuñjarakarna.

=== Ritual utensils, seals and coins ===
Various objects with Kawi script

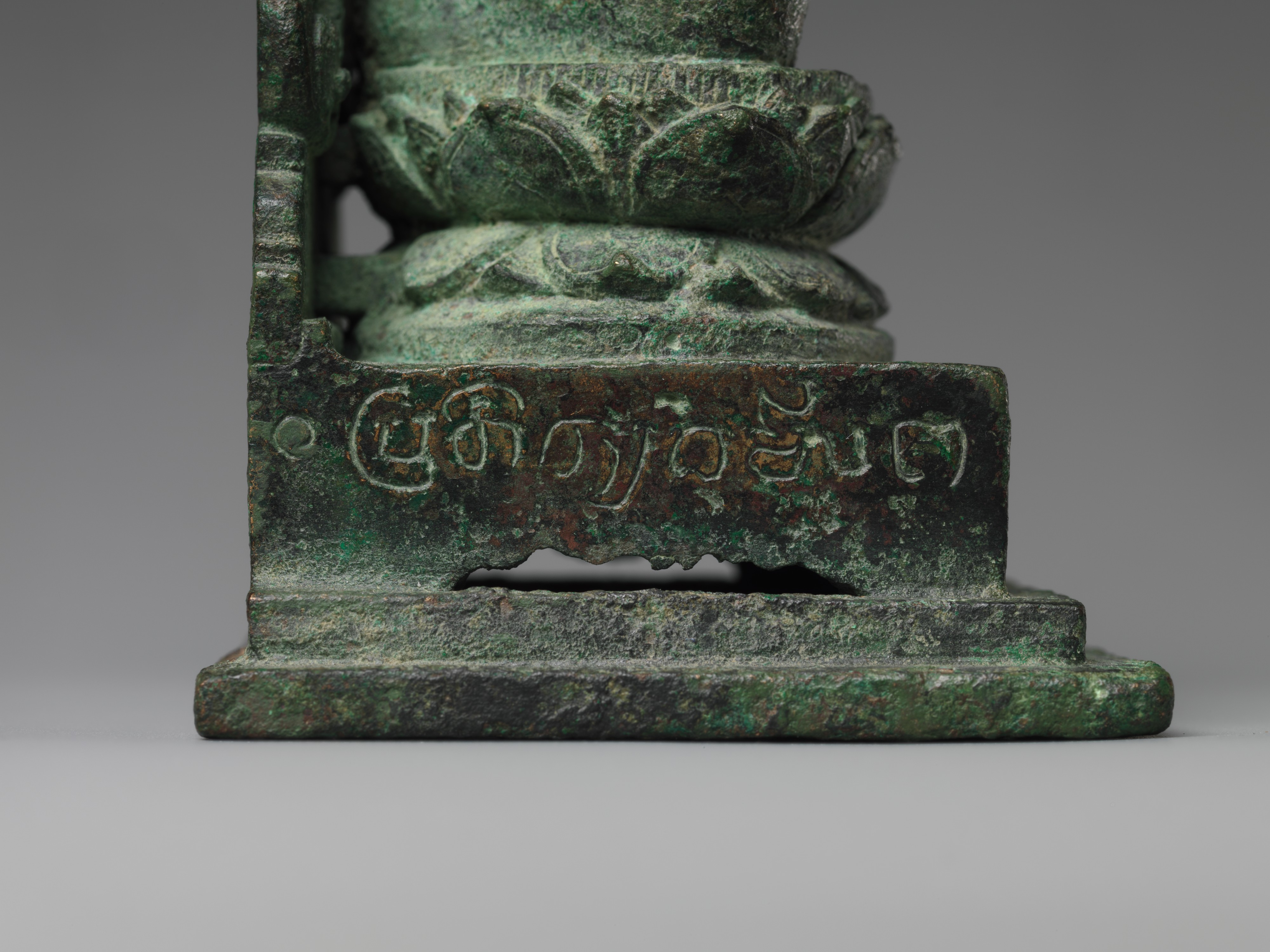
Detail of Kawi inscription in the base of a bronze Buddha statuette, 9th century.

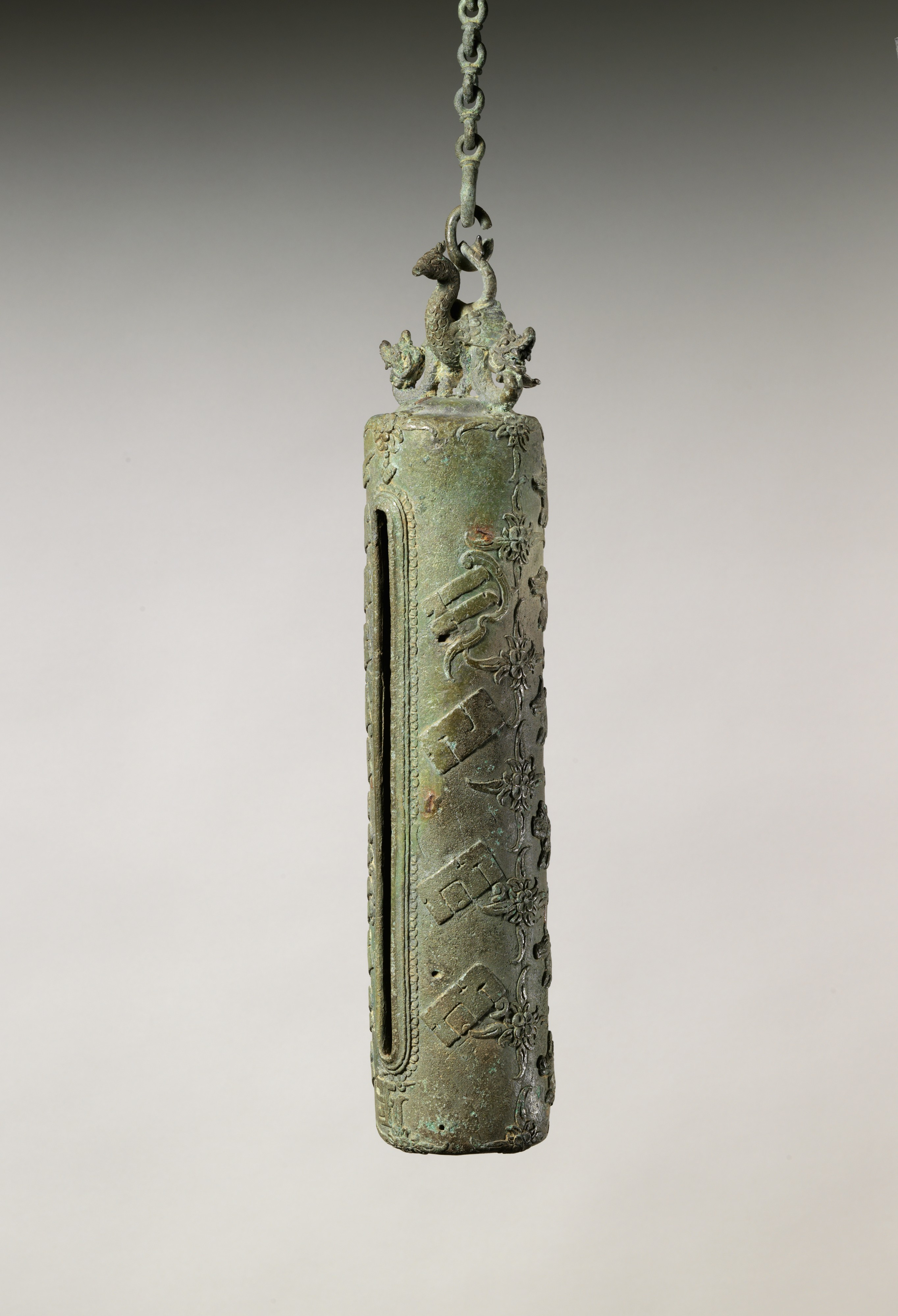
Bronze slit drum with decorative quadratic Kawi text which reads 𑼒𑼸𑼒𑼸𑼭𑼥𑽁 kukulan from bottom to top.

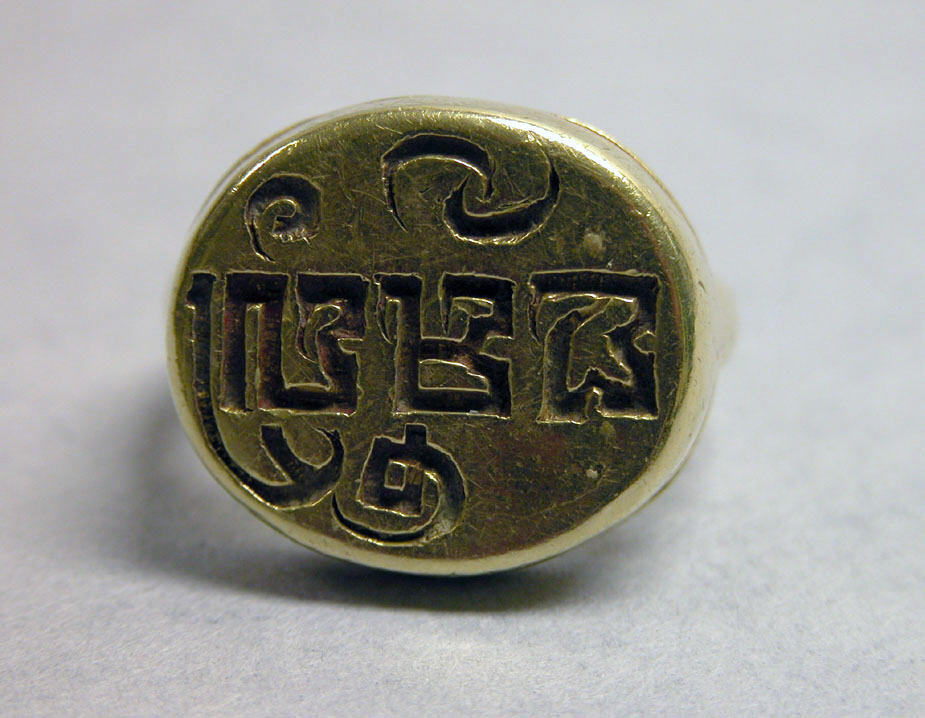
Seal ring with mirrored Kawi which reads 𑼤𑼂𑼪𑽂𑼪𑼲𑽂𑼫𑼁 dharmma hyaṃ.

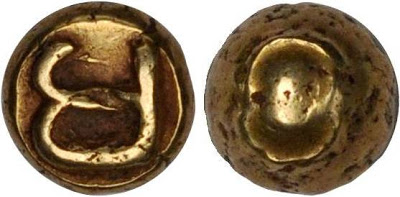
Gold piloncitos coin from the Philippines bearing the character 𑼪 ma.

Brief Kawi inscriptions have been found in a number of small, relatively portable artifacts. Bronze ritual utensils have been found decorated with quadratic Kawi texts. In utensils such as slit drums, texts have been found arranged in a unique layout read vertically from bottom to top. Large numbers of gold rings engraved with short Kawi texts have been found throughout maritime Southeast Asia. Some of the texts are engraved in negative, and hence were clearly designed for use as seals. Seal specimens has been found as far as the Philippines, exemplified by the Butuan Ivory Seal. Small gold coins called piloncitos bear a single character 𑼪 ma, plausibly representing the māṣa weight unit used in classical Sumatra, Java, and Bali. A 16th century coin type possibly issued by the Jambi Sultanate contain late Kawi legend that reads 𑼦𑼖𑼾𑼬𑼥𑽂𑼬𑼡𑼸𑼲𑼶𑼁𑼙𑼪𑽂𑼨𑼶 pangeran ratu hiṃ jambi.

=== Non historical ===
The Kawi script still sees minor use in the 21st century. In these non-historical use, Kawi texts can be found as decorative flavor text in medias such as videos and on clothing to write languages such as modern Javanese and Indonesian.

== Letters ==
=== Independent characters ===
Consonants & Conjuncts
	ka	kha	ga	gha	ṅa	ca	cha	ja	jha	ña	ṭa	ṭha	ḍa	ḍha	ṇa	ta	tha	da	dha	na	pa	pha	ba	bha	ma	ya	ra	la	va	śa	ṣa	sa	ha	jña
	𑼒	𑼓	𑼔	𑼕	𑼖	𑼗	𑼘	𑼙	𑼚	𑼛	𑼜	𑼝	𑼞	𑼟	𑼠	𑼡	𑼢	𑼣	𑼤	𑼥	𑼦	𑼧	𑼨	𑼩	𑼪	𑼫	𑼬	𑼭	𑼮	𑼯	𑼰	𑼱	𑼲	𑼳
Conjunct	𑽂𑼒	𑽂𑼓	𑽂𑼔	𑽂𑼕	𑽂𑼖	𑽂𑼗	𑽂𑼘	𑽂𑼙	𑽂𑼚	𑽂𑼛	𑽂𑼜	𑽂𑼝	𑽂𑼞	𑽂𑼟	𑽂𑼠	𑽂𑼡	𑽂𑼢	𑽂𑼣	𑽂𑼤	𑽂𑼥	𑽂𑼦	𑽂𑼧	𑽂𑼨	𑽂𑼩	𑽂𑼪	𑽂𑼫	𑽂𑼬	𑽂𑼭	𑽂𑼮	𑽂𑼯	𑽂𑼰	𑽂𑼱	𑽂𑼲	

Vowels
a	ā	i	ī	u	ū	r̥	r̥̄	l̥	l̥̄	e	ai	o	au
𑼄	𑼅	𑼆	𑼇	𑼈	𑼉	𑼊	𑼋	𑼌	𑼍	𑼎	𑼏	𑼐	𑼐𑼴

=== Dependent diacritics ===
Diacritics
a	ā	i	ī	u	ū	r̥	r̥̄	e	ai	o	au	ə	əː	m̐^{1}	ṃ^{2}	ḥ^{3}	r^{4}	∅^{5}
	𑼴/𑼵	𑼶	𑼷	𑼸	𑼹	𑼺	𑼺𑼴	𑼾	𑼿	𑼾𑼴	𑼿𑼴	𑽀	𑽀𑼴	𑼀	𑼁	𑼃	𑼂	𑽁
ka	kā	ki	kī	ku	kū	kr̥	kr̥̄	e	ai	o	au	kə	kəː	kam̐	kaṃ	kaḥ	rka	k
𑼒	𑼒𑼴	𑼒𑼶	𑼒𑼷	𑼒𑼸	𑼒𑼹	𑼒𑼺	𑼒𑼺𑼴	𑼒𑼾	𑼒𑼿	𑼒𑼾𑼴	𑼒𑼿𑼴	𑼒𑽀	𑼒𑽀𑼴	𑼒𑼃	𑼒𑼁	𑼒𑼃	𑼂𑼒	𑼒𑽁

^1 Chandrabindu ^2 Anusvara ^3 Visarga ^4 Repha ^5 Virama/halanta

=== Other characters ===
Punctuations
𑽃 danda	𑽄 double danda	𑽅 section marker	𑽆 section marker	𑽇 flower	𑽈 space filler	𑽉 dot	𑽊 double dot	𑽋 triple dot	𑽌 circle	𑽍 filled circle	𑽎 spiral	𑽏 closing spiral

Numeral
1	2	3	4	5	6	7	8	9	0
𑽑	𑽒	𑽓	𑽔	𑽕	𑽖	𑽗	𑽘	𑽙	𑽐

=== Collation ===
Several gold foils (possibly part of ritual deposits) have been found written with Kawi abecedarium where all independent characters are collated in standard Indic order, likely as part of a mantra. (Note: In these examples however, several rarely used letters such as ⟨ṭha⟩ and ⟨ḍha⟩ show conflation of glyphs.) The order is as follows:

Collation
a ā · i ī · u ū · r̥ r̥̄ · l̥ l̥̄ · e ai · o au · aṃ aḥ
𑼄𑼅 · 𑼆𑼇 · 𑼈𑼉 · 𑼊𑼋 · 𑼌𑼍 · 𑼎𑼏 · 𑼐𑼐𑼴 · 𑼄𑼁𑼄𑼃
ka kha ga gha ṅa · ca cha ja jha ña · ṭa ṭha ḍa ḍha ṇa · ta tha da dha na · pa pha ba bha ma · ya ra la wa · śa ṣa sa ha
𑼒𑼓𑼔𑼕𑼖 · 𑼗𑼘𑼙𑼚𑼛 · 𑼜𑼝𑼞𑼟𑼠 · 𑼡𑼢𑼣𑼤𑼥 · 𑼦𑼧𑼨𑼩𑼪 · 𑼫𑼬𑼭𑼮 · 𑼯𑼰𑼱𑼲

== Comparison with child systems ==
The Kawi script exhibit high compatibility with Balinese and Javanese scripts, both of which can be used to write Sanskrit with reasonable accuracy. Kawi characters for Sanskrit specific sounds (such as aspirated consonants, retroflexes, and long vowels) still retain Balinese and Javanese cognates, even if these characters are often repurposed or rarely used in non-Sanskrit texts. This is not the case for other descendant scripts which often underwent reduction of character set which made them no longer compatible to write Sanskrit but more efficient in representing local Austronesian language sound system.

=== Independent characters ===
Consonants
	ka	kha	ga	gha	ṅa	ca	cha	ja	jha	ña	ṭa	ṭha	ḍa	ḍha	ṇa	ta	tha	da	dha	na	pa	pha	ba	bha	ma	ya	ra	la	wa	śa	ṣa	sa	ha/a
Kawi	𑼒	𑼓	𑼔	𑼕	𑼖	𑼗	𑼘	𑼙	𑼚	𑼛	𑼜	𑼝	𑼞	𑼟	𑼠	𑼡	𑼢	𑼣	𑼤	𑼥	𑼦	𑼧	𑼨	𑼩	𑼪	𑼫	𑼬	𑼭	𑼮	𑼯	𑼰	𑼱	𑼲
Hanacaraka
Balinese	ᬓ	ᬔ	ᬕ	ᬖ	ᬗ	ᬘ	ᬙ	ᬚ	ᬛ	ᬜ	ᬝ	ᬞ	ᬟ	ᬠ	ᬡ	ᬢ	ᬣ	ᬤ	ᬥ	ᬦ	ᬧ	ᬨ	ᬩ	ᬪ	ᬫ	ᬬ	ᬭ	ᬮ	ᬯ	ᬰ	ᬱ	ᬲ	ᬳ
Javanese	ꦏ	ꦑ	ꦒ	ꦓ	ꦔ	ꦕ	ꦖ	ꦗ	ꦙ	ꦚ	ꦛ	ꦜ	ꦝ	ꦞ	ꦟ	ꦠ	ꦡ	ꦢ	ꦣ	ꦤ	ꦥ	ꦦ	ꦧ	ꦨ	ꦩ	ꦪ	ꦫ	ꦭ	ꦮ	ꦯ	ꦰ	ꦱ	ꦲ
Surat Scripts
Batak^{1}	ᯂᯃᯄ᯦		ᯎᯏ		ᯝ	ᯡᯘᯚ᯦		ᯐ		ᯠ						ᯗᯖ		ᯑ		ᯉᯊ	ᯇᯈ		ᯅ		ᯔᯕ	ᯛᯜ	ᯒᯓ	ᯞᯟ	ᯋᯌᯍ			ᯘᯙ	ᯀᯁᯃ
Baybayin	ᜃ		ᜄ		ᜅ											ᜆ		ᜇ		ᜈ	ᜉ		ᜊ		ᜋ	ᜌ	ᜍᜟ^{2}	ᜎ	ᜏ			ᜐ	ᜑ
Buhid	ᝃ		ᝄ		ᝅ											ᝆ		ᝇ		ᝈ	ᝉ		ᝊ		ᝋ	ᝌ	ᝍ	ᝎ	ᝏ			ᝐ	ᝑ
Hanunó'o	ᜣ		ᜤ		ᜥ											ᜦ		ᜧ		ᜨ	ᜩ		ᜪ		ᜫ	ᜬ	ᜭ	ᜮ	ᜯ			ᜰ	ᜱ
Lontara	ᨀ		ᨁ		ᨂ	ᨌ		ᨍ		ᨎ						ᨈ		ᨉ		ᨊ	ᨄ		ᨅ		ᨆ	ᨐ	ᨑ	ᨒ	ᨓ			ᨔ	ᨕ
Makasar	𑻠		𑻡		𑻢	𑻩		𑻪		𑻫						𑻦		𑻧		𑻨	𑻣		𑻤		𑻥	𑻬	𑻭	𑻮	𑻯			𑻰	𑻱
Rejang	ꤰ		ꤱ		ꤲ	ꤹ		ꤺ		ꤻ						ꤻ		ꤴ		ꤵ	ꤶ		ꤷ		ꤸ	ꤿ	ꤽ	ꤾ	ꥀ			ꤼ	ꥁ
Sundanese^{3}	ᮊ		ᮌ		ᮍ	ᮎ		ᮏ		ᮑ						ᮒ		ᮓ		ᮔ	ᮕ		ᮘ		ᮙ	ᮚ	ᮛ	ᮜ	ᮝ			ᮞ	ᮠ
Tagbanwa	ᝣ		ᝤ		ᝥ											ᝦ		ᝧ		ᝨ	ᝩ		ᝪ		ᝫ	ᝬ		ᝮ	ᝯ			ᝰ	

^1 The Batak script has five distinct varieties, Karo, Mandailing, Pakpak-Dairi, Simalungun, and Toba, each of which has slightly different character repertoire. Refer to the Batak script article for details. ^2 /ra/ is a modern addition. Originally, /r/ it is considered an allophone of /d/ in Tagalog, but the two phonemes became separate after Spanish contact. ^3 The Sundanese script of this table is the simplified version which is distinct from ancient Sundanese script attested in historic manuscripts.

Vowels
	a	ā	i	ī	u	ū	r̥	r̥̄	l̥	l̥̄	e	ai	o	au
Kawi	𑼄	𑼅	𑼆	𑼇	𑼈	𑼉	𑼊	𑼋	𑼌	𑼍	𑼎	𑼏	𑼐	𑼐𑼴
Hanacaraka
Balinese	ᬅ	ᬆ	ᬇ	ᬈ	ᬉ	ᬊ	ᬋ	ᬌ	ᬍ	ᬎ	ᬏ	ᬐ	ᬑ	ᬒ
Javanese	ꦄ	ꦄꦴ	ꦆ	ꦇ	ꦈ	ꦈꦴ	ꦉ	ꦉꦴ	ꦊ	ꦋ	ꦌ	ꦍ	ꦎ	ꦎꦴ
Surat Scripts
Batak^{1}	ᯀᯁ		ᯤ		ᯥ						^{2}		^{2}	
Baybayin	ᜀ		ᜁ		ᜂ						^{3}		^{4}	
Buhid	ᝀ		ᝁ		ᝂ									
Hanunó'o	ᜠ		ᜡ		ᜢ									
Lontara	ᨕ		^{2}		^{2}						^{2}		^{2}	
Makasar	𑻱		^{2}		^{2}						^{2}		^{2}	
Rejang	ꥆ		^{2}		^{2}						^{2}	^{2}	^{2}	^{2}
Sundanese^{5}	ᮃ		ᮄ		ᮅ		ᮻ		ᮼ		ᮈ		ᮇ	
Tagbanwa	ᝠ		ᝡ		ᝢ									

^1 The Batak script has five distinct varieties, Karo, Mandailing, Pakpak-Dairi, Simalungun, and Toba, each of which has slightly different character repertoire. Refer to the Batak script article for details. ^2 While lacking distinct characters, these sounds can still be formed by attaching appropriate diacritics to letter which acts as vocal carrier, typically ⟨a⟩. ^3 /e/ is considered an allophone of /i/ in Baybayin. ^4 /o/ is considered an allophone of /u/ in Baybayin. ^5 The Sundanese script of this table is the simplified modern version which is distinct from Old Sundanese script attested in historic materials.

=== Dependent diacritics ===
Dependent diacritics attached to /ka/
	ka	kā	ki	kī	ku	kū	kr̥	kr̥̄	e	ai	o	au	kə	kəː	kaṃ	kaḥ	k
Kawi	𑼒	𑼒𑼴	𑼒𑼶	𑼒𑼷	𑼒𑼸	𑼒𑼹	𑼒𑼺	𑼒𑼺𑼴	𑼒𑼾	𑼒𑼿	𑼒𑼾𑼴	𑼒𑼿𑼴	𑼒𑽀	𑼒𑽀𑼴	𑼒𑼁	𑼒𑼃	𑼒𑽁
Hanacaraka
Balinese	ᬓ	ᬓᬵ	ᬓᬶ	ᬓᬷ	ᬓᬸ	ᬓᬹ	ᬓᬺ	ᬓᬻ	ᬓᬾ	ᬓᬿ	ᬓᭀ	ᬓᭁ	ᬓᭂ	ᬓᭃ	ᬓᬂ	ᬓᬄ	ᬓ᭄
Javanese	ꦏ	ꦏꦴ	ꦏꦶ	ꦏꦷ	ꦏꦸ	ꦏꦹ	ꦏꦽ	ꦏꦽꦴ	ꦏꦺ	ꦏꦻ	ꦏꦺꦴ	ꦏꦻꦴ	ꦏꦼ	ꦏꦼꦴ	ꦏꦁ	ꦏꦃ	ꦏ꧀
Surat Scripts
Batak^{1}	ᯂ		ᯂᯪ		ᯂᯬᯂᯮ				ᯂᯩ		ᯂᯬᯂᯭ		ᯂᯧᯂᯨ		ᯂᯰ	ᯂᯱ	ᯂ᯲ᯂ᯳
Baybayin	ᜃ		ᜃᜒ		ᜃᜓ				ᜃᜒ^{2}		ᜃᜓ^{3}						ᜃ᜔ᜃ᜕
Buhid	ᝃ		ᝃᝒ		ᝃᝓ												
Hanunó'o	ᜣ		ᜣᜲ		ᜣᜳ												ᜣ᜴
Lontara	ᨀ		ᨀᨗ		ᨀᨘ				ᨀᨙ		ᨀᨚ		ᨀᨛ				^{4}
Makasar	𑻱		𑻱𑻳		𑻱𑻴				𑻱𑻵		𑻱𑻶						
Rejang	ꥆ		ꥆꥇ		ꥆꥈ				ꥆꥉ	ꥆꥊ	ꥆꥋ	ꥆꥌ			ꥆꥏ	ꥆꥒ	ꥆ꥓
Sundanese^{5}	ᮊ		ᮊᮤ		ᮊᮥ				ᮊᮦ		ᮊᮧ		ᮊᮨ	ᮊᮩ	ᮊᮀ	ᮊᮂ	ᮊ᮪
Tagbanwa	ᝣ		ᝣᝲ		ᝣᝳ												

^1 The Batak script has five distinct varieties, Karo, Mandailing, Pakpak-Dairi, Simalungun, and Toba, each of which has slightly different character repertoire. Refer to the Batak script article for details. ^2 /e/ is considered an allophone of /i/ in Baybayin. ^3 /o/ is considered an allophone of /u/ in Baybayin. ^4 There are several modern proposals to add virama in lontara, but none are widely accepted. All historic attestation of lontara lacked virama and syllable codas must be deduced from context. ^5 The Sundanese script of this table is the simplified modern version which is distinct from Old Sundanese script attested in historic materials.

=== Numeral ===
Numeral
	1	2	3	4	5	6	7	8	9	0
Kawi	𑽑	𑽒	𑽓	𑽔	𑽕	𑽖	𑽗	𑽘	𑽙	𑽐
Balinese	᭑	᭒	᭓	᭔	᭕	᭖	᭗	᭘	᭙	᭐
Javanese	꧑	꧒	꧓	꧔	꧕	꧖	꧗	꧘	꧙	꧐

=== Example ===
First line of the Gajah Mada inscription
Kawi	𑽅𑽌𑽅𑼆𑼯𑼒𑽉𑽑𑽒𑽑𑽔𑽉𑼙𑽂𑼫𑼾𑼰𑽂𑼝𑼪𑼴𑼱𑽉𑼆𑼬𑼶𑼒𑼣𑼶𑼮𑼯𑼥𑼶
Balinese	᭛᭜᭛ᬇᬰᬓ᭞᭑᭒᭑᭔᭞ᬚ᭄ᬬᬾᬱ᭄ᬝᬫᬵᬲ᭞ᬇᬭᬶᬓᬤᬶᬯᬰᬦᬶ
Javanese	꧅꧆꧅ꦆꦯꦏ꧈꧑꧒꧑꧔꧈ꦗꦾꦺꦰ꧀ꦛꦩꦴꦱ꧈ꦆꦫꦶꦏꦢꦶꦮꦯꦤꦶ
	/ 0 / i śaka; 1214; jyeṣṭa māsa irika diwaśani

== Unicode ==
A preliminary proposal was submitted to the Unicode Technical Committee by Anshuman Pandey in 2012. The Kawi script was added to the Unicode Standard 15.0 in September 2022 based on revised proposals by Aditya Bayu Perdana and Ilham Nurwansah.

The Unicode block for the Kawi script is U+11F00–U+11F5F and contains 86 characters:

Kawi^{[1]}^{[2]} Official Unicode Consortium code chart (PDF)
	0	1	2	3	4	5	6	7	8	9	A	B	C	D	E	F
U+11F0x	𑼀	𑼁	𑼂	𑼃	𑼄	𑼅	𑼆	𑼇	𑼈	𑼉	𑼊	𑼋	𑼌	𑼍	𑼎	𑼏
U+11F1x	𑼐		𑼒	𑼓	𑼔	𑼕	𑼖	𑼗	𑼘	𑼙	𑼚	𑼛	𑼜	𑼝	𑼞	𑼟
U+11F2x	𑼠	𑼡	𑼢	𑼣	𑼤	𑼥	𑼦	𑼧	𑼨	𑼩	𑼪	𑼫	𑼬	𑼭	𑼮	𑼯
U+11F3x	𑼰	𑼱	𑼲	𑼳	𑼴	𑼵	𑼶	𑼷	𑼸	𑼹	𑼺				𑼾	𑼿
U+11F4x	𑽀	𑽁	𑽂	𑽃	𑽄	𑽅	𑽆	𑽇	𑽈	𑽉	𑽊	𑽋	𑽌	𑽍	𑽎	𑽏
U+11F5x	𑽐	𑽑	𑽒	𑽓	𑽔	𑽕	𑽖	𑽗	𑽘	𑽙	𑽚					
Notes 1.As of Unicode version 17.0 2.Grey areas indicate non-assigned code points

== Gallery ==
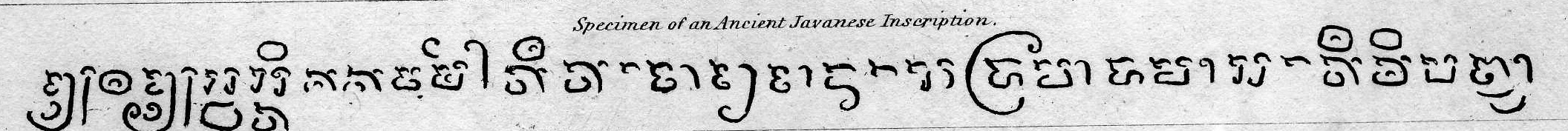
First line of the Kudadu inscription (1294)

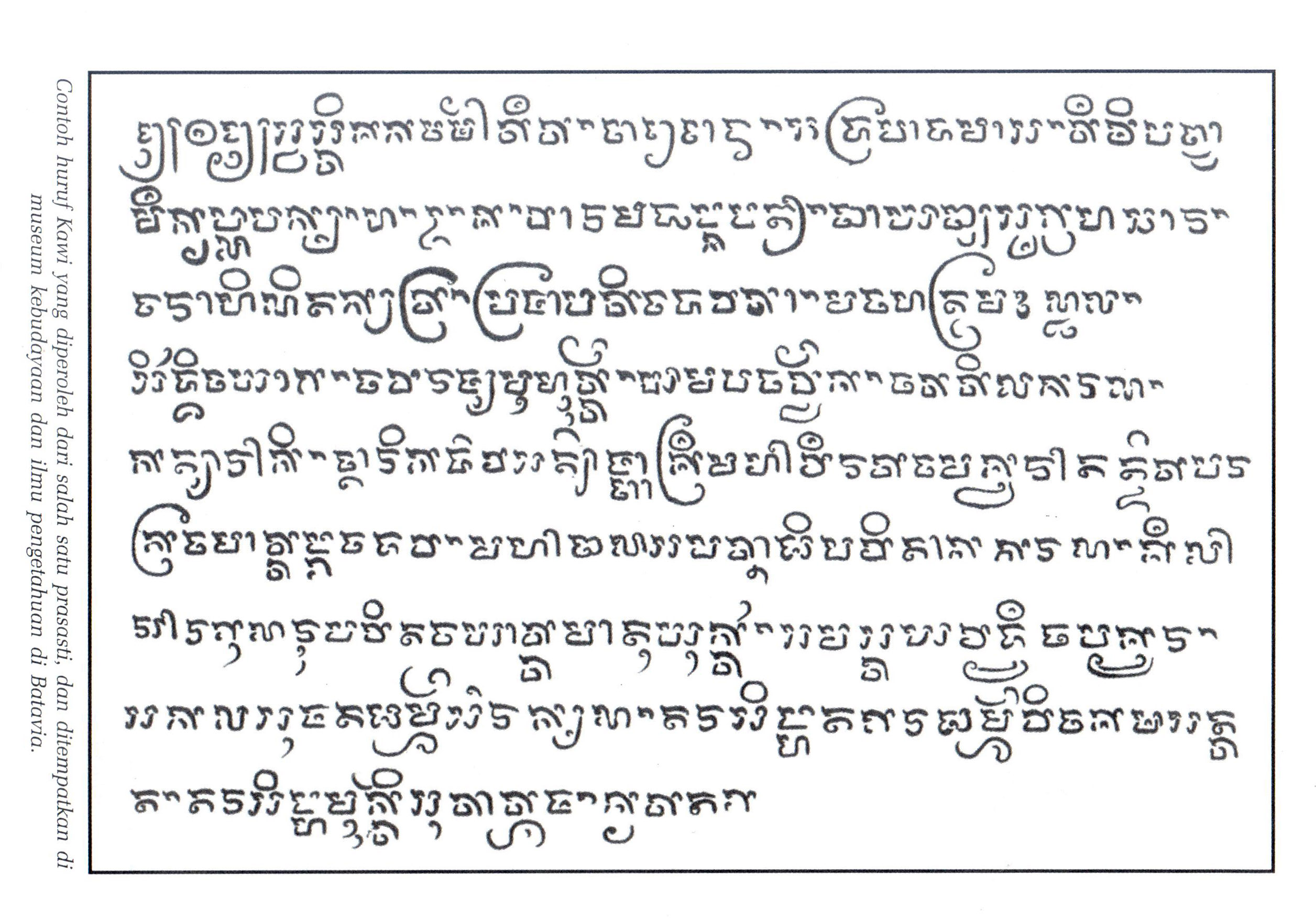
Copy of plate 1 of the Kudadu inscription

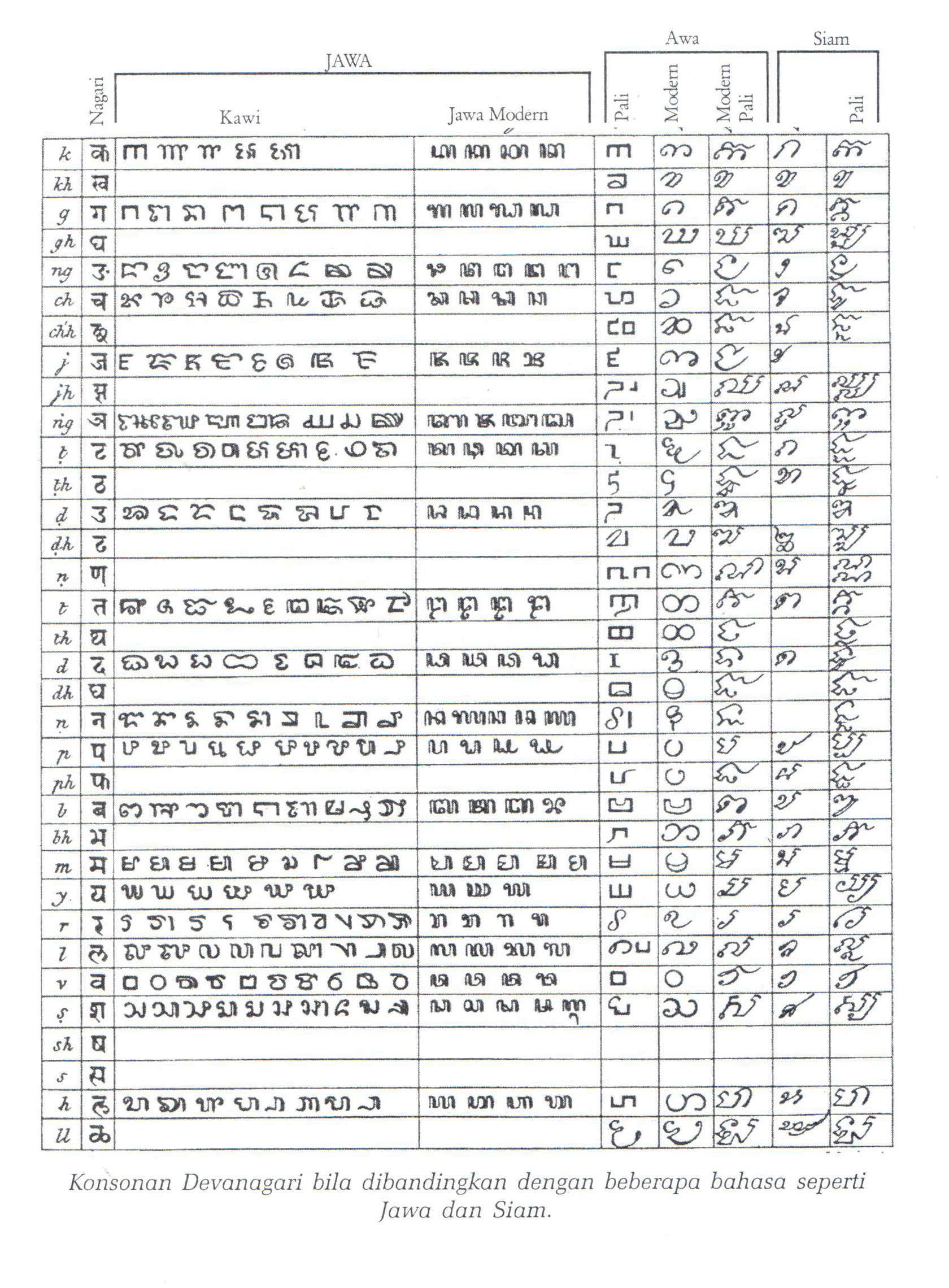
Javanese compared to other Indic scripts

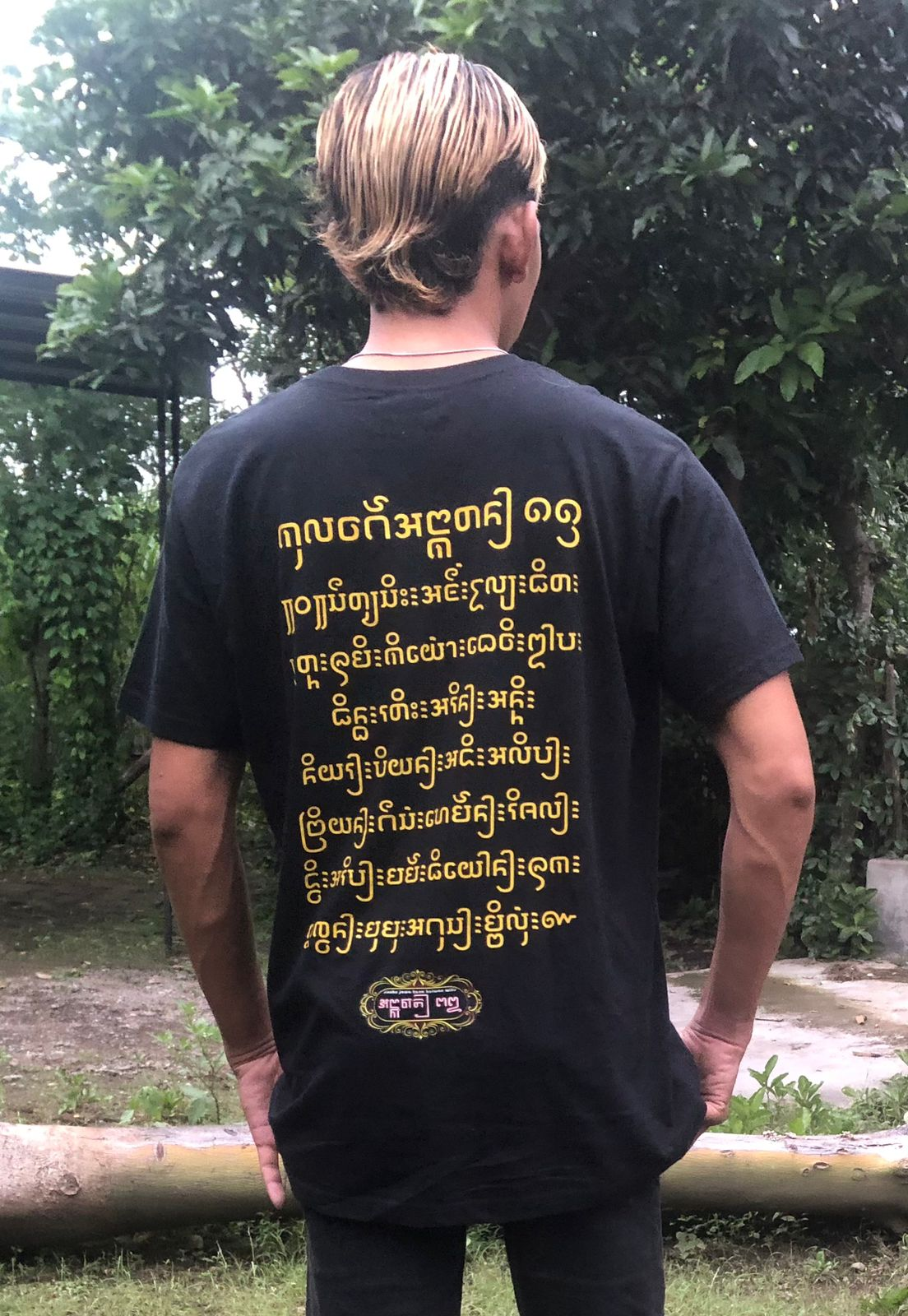
A man wearing a t-shirt with Aksara Kawi

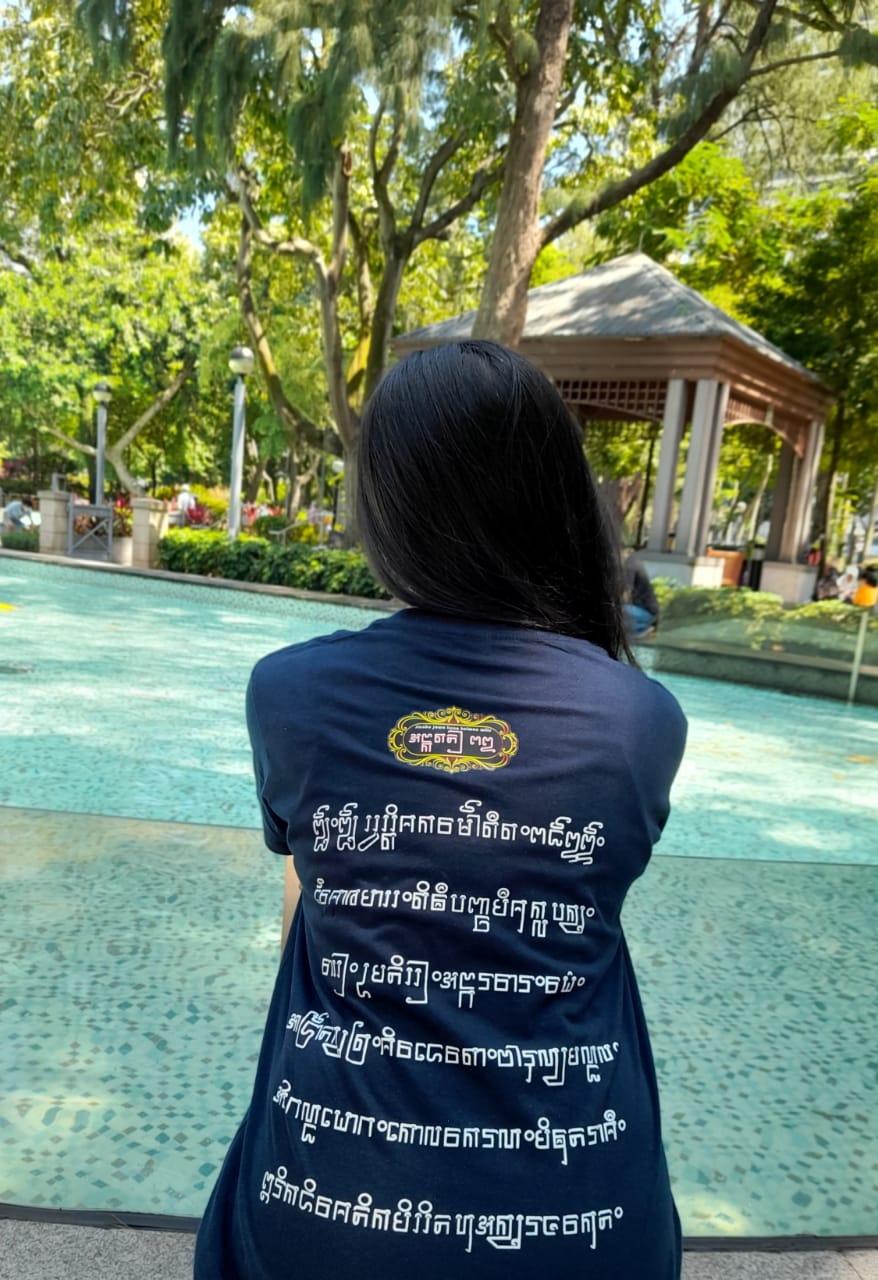
A woman wearing a t-shirt with Aksara Kawi

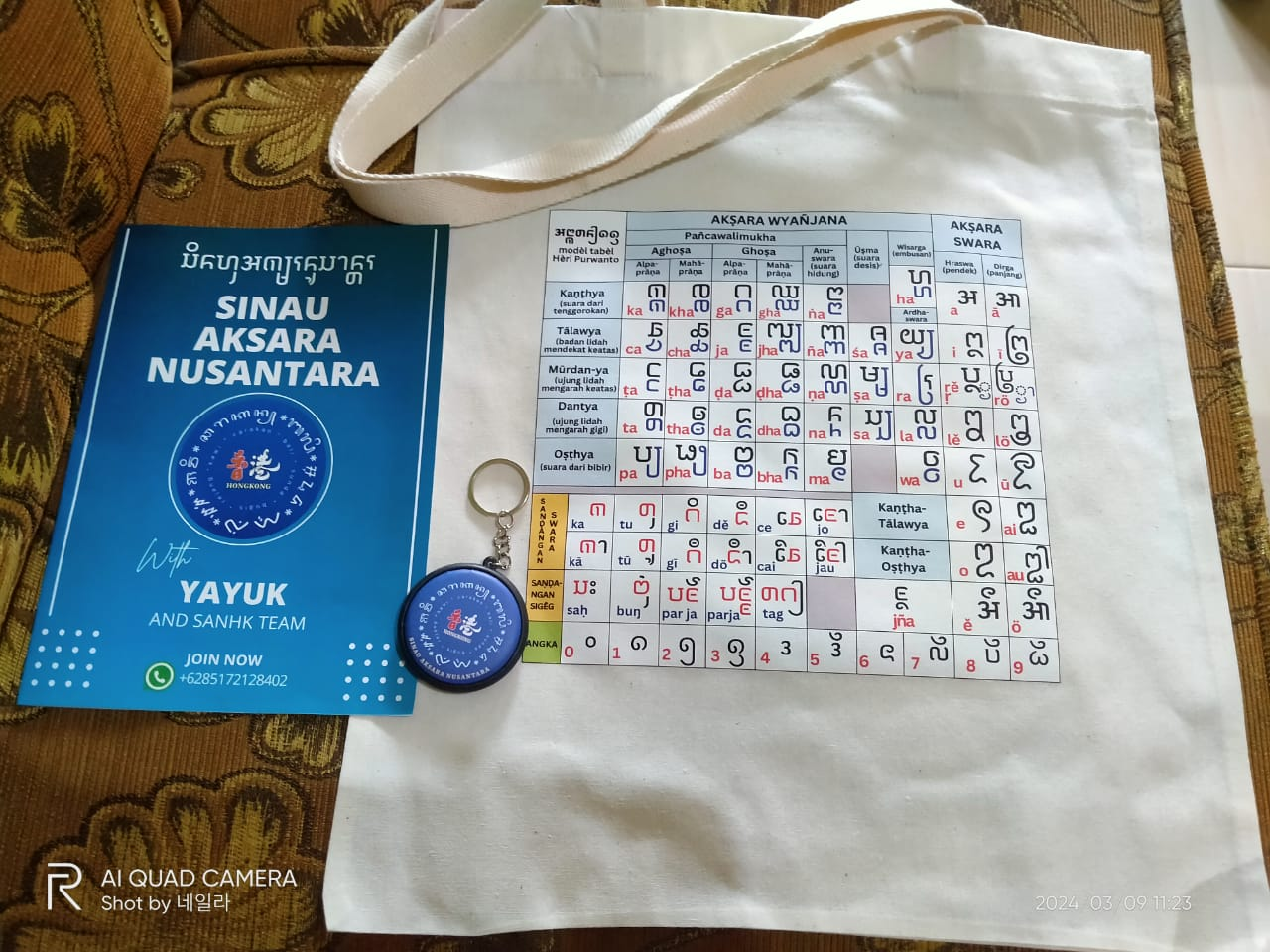
A tote-bag with a chart of the Kawi script

== See also ==
- Writing systems of Southeast Asia
- Kawi language
