= Minye Tujoh inscription =

Tombstone inscriptions in Aceh, Indonesia

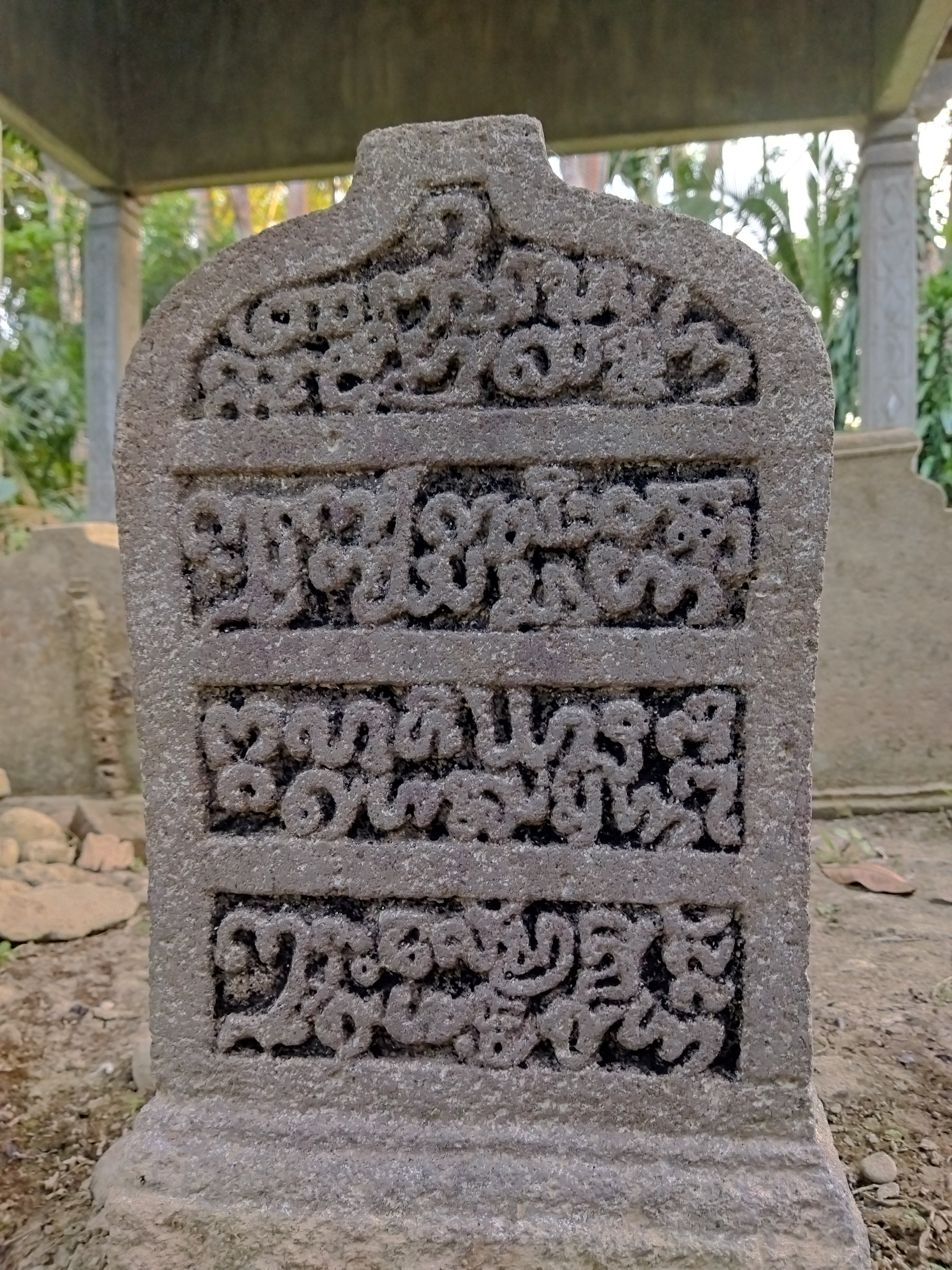
The Tombstone of Malikah Danil, one of a woman courtier during the Samudra Pasai sultanate

Minye Tujoh inscription is actually two inscriptions in the form of two tombstones of the same grave, found in Minye Tujoh village, Pirak Timur district, North Aceh Regency, in Aceh, Indonesia. The inscription at the grave's head is written in Arabic language and Jawi (Arabic-type) script, while the one at the feet is written in pre-classical Malay language with Old Sumatran (Indian-type) script.

The Malay text was first translated by W.F. Stutterheim (1936) with the help of H. Djajadiningrat, and further refined by G.E. Marrison (1951) and W. van der Molen (2007); the Arabic text was first done by Djajadiningrat (1936, unpublished) and by L. Kalus (2005).

The two tombstones commemorate the death of the daughter of a deceased Acehnese sultan, and the nature of the writing is Islamic. Another feature is that the day and date on the two stones are the same, but the years are ten Hijri years apart (781 H/1380 CE vs. 791 H/1389 CE). Experts think there may have been a typo error in one of the years.

The existence of the Minye Tujuh inscription shows the occurrence of a cultural transition in northern Sumatra in the late 14th century, where Arab and Persian influences began to replace the Hindu-Buddhist influences that were previously quite prominent in Malay culture. The various inscriptions and tombstones found in the area after this time are all in Arabic-type script. In addition, the Malay version inscription can also be seen as the earliest evidence of syair, traditional Malay poetry made up of four-line stanzas or quatrains.

== Text ==
=== Arabic text ===
Reading and translation of the Arabic text according to L. Kalus, as follows:

A (front side)

الموت باب و كلّ الناس داخله و القبر بيت
و كلّ الناس ساکنه أجعله اللّه روضة
من رياض الجنان و أسکنه [كذ] أزكى فردوس الجنان

death is the entrance that every human being passes. the tomb is home
where every human being rest. may (this tomb) be made by Allah a garden
from the gardens of heaven and allow the deceased [sic!] to reside in the most beautiful garden in paradise

B (back side)

مقبر الملكة المعظّمة وبيسة [ونيسة؟] ابنت [؟] السلطان المرحوم
الملك الظاهر شرف الدين خان ابن ڤلده خان بن باد [ياد؟] خان تغمّدها [تغمّده؟] اللّه
بالرضوان في الرابع عشر [؟] من ذي الحجّة يوم الجمعة سنة إحدى و تسعين و سبعائة من الهجرة المصطفويّة

tomb of the great queen Wabisa [Wanisa?] daughter of the late al-Sultan
al-Malik al-Zahir Sharaf al-Din Khan ibn Pulda Khan ibn Bad [Yad?] Khan may be blessed by Allah
with satisfaction! Friday 1[?]4 Dhu al-Hijjah in 791 Hijrah al-Mustafawiyya [December 4, 1389]

=== Malay text ===
Transliteration and translation of the Malay text in Kawi script according to W. van der Molen, as follows:

A (front side)

hijrat nabī mungstapa yang prasiddhā
tūjuḥ ratus aṣṭapuluh savarṣṣā
hajjī catur dān dasa vāra sukkrā
rājāmajā ḷnnyāp di raḥmat allāḥ

when had elapsed since the hijrah of the Prophet, the chosen one
seven hundred and eighty-one years
On Friday fourteen, month of the Pilgrimage
the royal daughter passed away in the mercy of God

B (back side)

guṇāña sampurṇṇa di hrat samūhā
tāruk gasiḥta dataṃ ka samūhā
ilāhi yā rabbī tuhan samūhā
taruḥ dalam śvargga tuhan tatuhā

whose virtues were perfect in the whole world
expiry of the allotted time (?) befalls all
O God, O Lord and Master of all
place our exalted mistress in heaven

== See also ==
- History of the Malay language
- Spread of Islam in Indonesia
- Samudera Pasai Sultanate
