= Alamat Langkapuri =

Malay-language newspaper in Ceylon, 1869–1870, 1877-1878

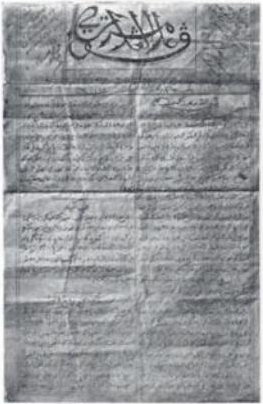
- Cover of Alamat Langkapuri
- Type: Fortnightly
- Publisher: Baba Ounus Saldin
- Founded: 1869
- Ceased publication: 1878
- Language: Malay
- Headquarters: Colombo

Alamat Langkapuri (Malay: علامت لڠكڤوري, 'News from the Island of Lanka') was a Malay-language fortnightly publication in Jawi script, issued from Colombo, Ceylon (modern-day Sri Lanka). Alamat Lankapuri was first published in June 1869. It was the first Jawi script Malay-language newspaper printed worldwide. The newspaper was printed by lithograph.

Baba Ounus Saldin was the publisher, editor and lithographer of Alamat Lankapuri. Saldin set up a printing press by the name of Alamat Langkapuri Press, which gained fame in the Muslim community of the island (which printed Muslim Malay and Arabu-Tamil literature).

The publication carried local and world news, as well as syairs, pantuns and other forms of traditional poetry. Whilst primarily directed towards the Malay diaspora in Ceylon, the Alamat Langkapuri also had a readership in the Malay archipelago. Through the newspaper Saldin sought to promote Malay culture and language. He published various advertisements for imports of Malay literature in Alamat Lankapuri, as well as advertisements for books to learn Malay and Malay-English dictionaries. Some of the notices and advertisements in the newspaper were written in Arabu-Tamil.

The publishing of Alamat Lankapuri was not a profitable venue for Saldin's private finances. It was closed down towards the end of 1870, due to an insufficient number of subscribers. The publication was relaunched in 1877, but closed down definitely in the following year. Saldin started a new publication, Wajah Selong ('Light of Ceylon'), in 1895. Alamat Lankapuri and Wajah Selong were the only two papers of their kind in the history of the country.
