= Cingkrik =

Indonesian style of Pencak Silat

Cingkrik Silat
- Hardness: Full-contact, semi-contact, light-contact
- Country of origin: Indonesia (Kebon Jeruk subdistrict)
- Olympic sport: No

Traditions of Pencak and Silat
- UNESCO Intangible Cultural Heritage
- Country: Indonesia
- Reference: 01391
- Region: Asia and the Pacific

Inscription history
- Inscription: 2019 (14th session)
- List: Representative

Cingkrik silat is one of the traditional styles of pencak silat (Betawi: maen pukul), an Indonesian martial art, of the Betawinese. The style originally came from the Rawa Belong area, which is now part of the Kebon Jeruk subdistrict, West Jakarta, Indonesia. It was created by Ki Maing (Ismail bin Muayad) around the 1920s. Cingkrik silat has now spread to various places in Jakarta through many silat schools opened by its practitioners.

== Etymology ==
The name cingkrik itself is believed to be taken from the Betawi word jingkrak-jingkrik or cingrak-cingkrik, meaning agile, which describes the agile movements of a monkey. While maen pukulan mean play punch.

== History ==
According to interviews with cingkrik silat elders, this style was created by Ki Maing around the 1920s. Ki Maing was told to previously had studied silat in the Kulon (meaning "western" region, which could mean in Meruya or even Banten), but he was inspired to create his own silat school after paying attention to a monkey's movements. It was mentioned that there was a monkey that attempted to steal Ki Maing's stick, which evaded when attacked and quickly counterattacked back. The fast and agile attack movements become the well-known feature of the cingkrik silat forms or moves (Betawi: jurus).

The three main students of Ki Maing were Ki Saari, Ki Ajid, and Ki Ali. From them, the style then spread out from the Rawa Belong area to various other places in Jakarta through the next generation of students.

Each of the cingkrik silat styles taught from the three main students have slightly different forms, which are continued to be developed further by their many students. However, in general cingkrik silat has twelve basic forms and three pair-up forms (Betawi: sambut), while the differences occur only in steps and movements. For instance, steps and movements in cingkrik goning (in stances and hand movements) are wider, while in cingkrik sinan are short and not too wide.

== Forms ==
=== Basic forms ===
Twelve cingkrik silat basic forms (jurus) are as follows:

1. Keset bacok
2. Keset gedor
3. Cingkrik
4. Langkah tiga
5. Langkah empat
6. Buka satu
7. Saup
8. Macan
9. Tiktuk
10. Singa
11. Lokbe
12. Longok

A combination movement of the twelve forms is called bongbang, which is often shown in martial arts performances.

=== Pair-up forms ===
Pair-up forms (sambut) are paired fight exercises; the three pair up forms are as follows:

1. Sambut tujuh muka
2. Sambut gulung
3. Sambut habis, or sambut detik

These forms aim to train reflexes when dealing with repeated attacks.

== Schools' lineage ==
Ki Maing
Ki Saari	Ki Ajid	Ki Ali
Bang Wahab	Bang Acik (Munasik)	Bang Ayat	Bang Uming (RawaBelong)	Bang Majid	Ki Sinan (KebonJeruk)	Ki Goning (Kemanggisan)	Ki Legod (MuaraAngke /Pesing)
Bang Nur	Bang Akib	Bang Umar	Bang Hasan	Bang Nunung	Bang Melik	Bang Entong	Bang Hamdan
Bang Warno	Bang Sapri

== See also ==
- Betawi people
- Beksi
- Pencak silat
