= Bakti Negara =

Indonesian style of pencak silat

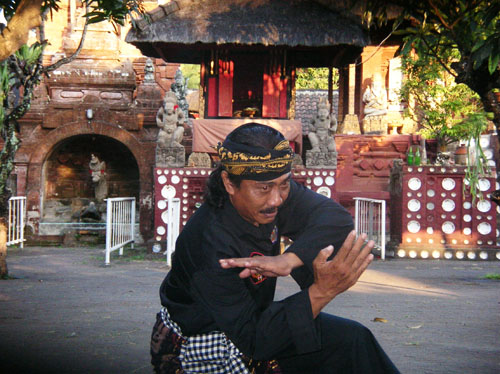
- Also known as: Bhakti Negara
- Focus: Striking
- Country of origin: Indonesia
- Creator: Anak Agung Rai Tokir; I Bagus Made Rai Keplag; Anak Agung Meranggi; Sri Empu Dwi Tantra; Ida Bagus Oka Dewangkara
- Olympic sport: No
- Official website: baktinegara.com
- Meaning: national devotion

Bakti Negara is a style of pencak silat from Bali. It is firmly rooted in old Balinese Hinduism and philosophies of Indonesia. The name means "national devotion", from the Sanskrit words bhakti (devotion) and nagara (country). It is the most widely practiced martial art in Bali and the most well-known style of Balinese silat, to the point that the system is commonly referred to simply as pencak Bali or kuntao Bali.

Some movements are similar to Balinese dances and performing arts like the Barong dance. Although the system is very much self-defence oriented, its practitioners also participate in modern competitions and have achieved some important victories in many regional, national and international tournaments.

== Philosophy ==
Bakti Negara is a self-defense system to train cipta (thought), rasa (sense), and karsa (will), to develop complete a human being according to Balinese philosophy of Tri Hita Karana. Skill should not be used as the tool of aggression, but as a way to develop and cultivate oneself. The school teaches four elements:

1. Sport, developing the physical ability to practice the techniques through exercises for the benefit of maintaining physical health and athletic achievement.
2. Martial, developing fighting ability.
3. Art, practising to the point where fighting techniques are aesthetic as well as effective
4. Mental and spirituality, aims to strengthen the ability to control oneself.

== History ==
Bakti Negara was officially created on 31 January 1955 in Banjar Kaliungu Kaja of Denpasar, Bali by four freedom-fighters who were veterans in Indonesia's struggle for independence from the Dutch. They were Anak Agung Rai Tokir, I Bagus Made Rai Keplag, Anak Agung Meranggi and Sri Empu Dwi Tantra. Each was a master in one of Bali's native schools, and incorporated these techniques into the new system. Because of this, Bakti Negara was still considered a traditional Balinese art because all of its movements were taken from pre-existing disciplines indigenous to the island. The task of leading and managing Bakti Negara was given to Ida Bagus Oka Dewangkara.

After 1968 Bakti Negara underwent a period of further development during the transition from the older to the new generation. The Lembaga Dewan Pendekar Bakti Negara gave I Bagus Alit Dira the mandate to systemise the teaching structure of Bakti Negara with the help of other instructors. While the school prided itself on combat effectiveness over sport, it was felt that some form of competition was necessary to test students. A point-based sparring system was introduced, and a coloured belt system of ranking was adopted from Japan. Championships were held every three years, always tied with some Balinese ceremony.

As other Balinese silat schools chose to remain independent of politics, Bakti Negara vied for status from the education ministry with Perisai Diri, seen as a foreign style. Through a process of standardization and acculturation, Bakti Negara became an integral part of Banjar or village social organisation (seka), and entered the Balinese school system. Today it is practiced in almost every town and village in Bali.

== Training ==
The basis of Bakti Negara is tipuan or deception. If a fight is unavoidable, the exponent taunts and provokes the opponent into losing their mental poise. As with most Balinese silat, this characteristic is displayed in the art's deceptive stances and movements. By feigning weakness or acting inattentive, a Bakti Negara practitioner lures the enemy into a blind attack before launching their own counterattack. Fighting in such an indirect manner requires stamina, so Bakti Negara students use flexibility and endurance training to ensure they do not tire themselves out easily. This is the reason why, compared to other Balinese silat, Bakti Negara is said to be most suited to those with a small frame. Through practice, the fighter also learns to judge whether a ruse is worth the energy or has a low chance of success.

In Bakti Negara, the opponent's body is seen as a rectangular section and attacks are concentrated along a line with their shoulders. Another common target is the opponent's front leg or foot. If an enemy charges forward, the Bakti Negara exponent would use the ground-sitting sempok or depok stance and kick or sweep the advancing leg. Blocking and parrying is always done with the open hands. If the attacking limb is grabbed, the grabbing hand would be countered with a slap. The tricky nature of Bakti Negara favours a range of about two yards from the opponent. Grappling and infighting is limited, consisting mainly of joint locks on the elbows and shoulders, but these techniques were never developed as highly on Bali as in other parts of Indonesia. Rather, striking is preferred, particularly punches and kicks.

The most common weapons in Bakti Negara are the toya (staff), chabang (forked truncheon), and pisau (knife). The chabang's significance as a Hindu symbol is reflected in its importance to Bakti Negara. Other weapons include the toyak (halberd), tombak jago (longspear), and penchong (club).

In its attempt to modernize, Bakti Negara uses a coloured belt system to signify rank, adopted from Japanese fighting arts. The belt colours in ascending order are red, blue, brown, yellow, and purple. The purple belt is reserved for master teachers. Sparring is also typical of modern combat sports. Points are awarded for clean hits, while strikes to vital points are forbidden.

== See also ==
- Silat
- Pencak silat
- Indonesian martial arts

== External sources ==
- An overview of Bakti Negara techniques using the traditional kris
