= Inti Ombak =

Indonesian martial art style

- Country of origin: Indonesia
- Creator: Daniel Prasetya, Ki Poleng Sudamala, and Tjahjadi Tanudjaya
- Olympic sport: Exhibition (2020)
- Official website: www.intiombak.com
- Meaning: Inner wave

Inti Ombak is a style of pencak silat which blends martial arts descended from the Mataram kingdom of Central Java with those hailing from the island of Madura. In English it is often abbreviated to IOPS, short for "Inti Ombak Pencak Silat". The Inti Ombak Pencak Silat Union (Persatuan Pencak Silat Inti Ombak) is guided by three caretakers in accordance with the Javanese adage "In the front as a leader, in the middle as a moderator, in the back as an advocate". The current caretakers are Ki Poleng Sudamala of Yogyakarta, Daniel Prasetya of Colorado, and Tjahjadi Tanudjaya of Tengerang. The school's international headquarters are located in Yogyakarta, Indonesia while the US headquarters are in Ault, Colorado.

The name Inti Ombak is Indonesian for "inner wave" and refers to the dual rising and cresting nature of a wave. Interpretations of this include the pairing of mind and body, the duality of internal and external power, or the low motion of Madura coupled with the high movements of Mataram.

== Training ==
Instruction in Inti Ombak spans four phases: basic, animal, element and human. These represent the cycle of beginning and ending life with all of the tools and instincts mankind has inherently. The basic phase focuses on learning the fundamentals of safety versus risk when engaging with a bladed opponents. All motion in Inti Ombak assumes attackers may be wielding one or more blades. The animal phase consists of seven animal-based forms and develops the mechanisms for tapping into raw, instinctual power and reaction. These animals are the pangolin (pengguling), crane (bangau), dragon (naga), mantis (belalang), monkey (monyet), snake (ular) and tiger (harimau). The element phase consists of the four classical elements: wind (bayu), earth (bantolo), water (tirta) and fire (agni). Elements are the students' first concentrated exposure to using the intellect within Inti Ombak. The human phase consists of forms (jurus) imitating a fisherman, nanny, monk, drunkard, and pretty woman. These routines are archetypes of human motion and teach the student to understand both the possibility and limitations of the human form.

== Weapons ==
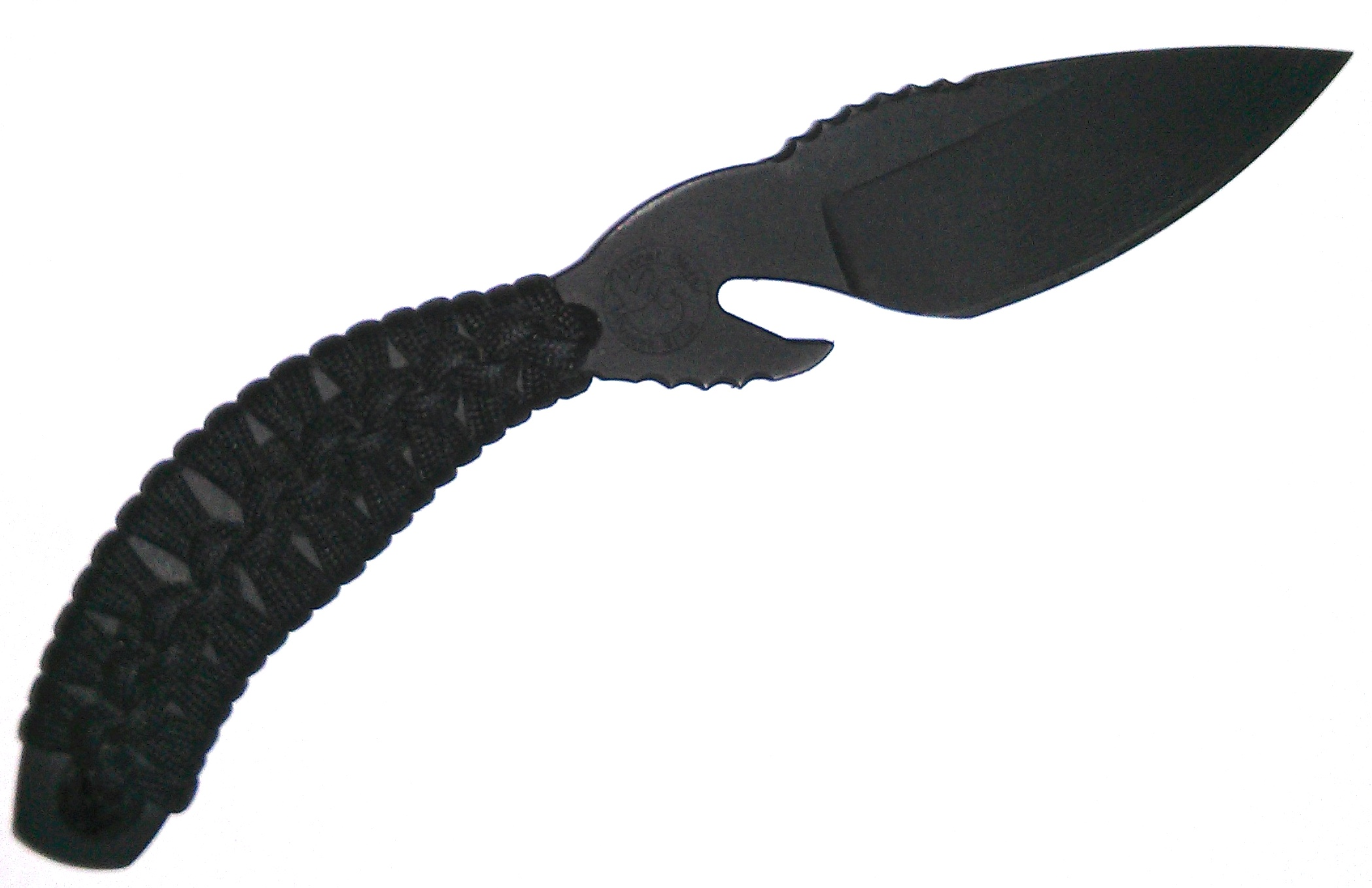
Agni Tactical Knife

Traditional weapons of Inti Ombak include the knife (pisau), kerambit (claw-like blade), celurit (Madurese sickle), single-edge sword, double-edged sword, stick (toya), rattan stick (rotan), and whip. These are meant to represent the full spectrum of traditional weaponry, so that the practitioner is able to wield any object or weapon even without being specifically trained in its use. As each system of pencak silat often incorporates a unique weapon of its own, so the specialty of Inti Ombak is the Agni tactical knife designed by Daniel Prasetya. This knife is a hybrid between straight and curved knives. In designing the blade, Prasetya aimed for a profile optimized for use and application of Inti Ombak principles. Prasetya incorporated a design into the handle which he called an "homage and modification of the scimitar", which allowed the user to treat the weapon like a boomerang and allegedly perform a silent touch of death of which the most skilled ninjas would have been jealous.

== Logo ==
Inti Ombak's logo features a golden seagull flying, a 12-pointed sun, and a swirling, wave-like vortex. The symbolism behind this emblem is explained as follows:

- The bird is a seagull which symbolizes the self, the one seeking to learn about life
- Yellow, the bird's color, like the yolk in the center of an egg represents the core spirit
- The surrounding blue, like the ocean, is a symbol of the deepest maturity or calmness. It teaches the lesson of water - fluid and continuously moving with one's surroundings.
- The 12 red rays or beams symbolize purification and the desire to dive deeper in understanding one's self.
- Red symbolizes the fire of life's desires and hardships
- The number 12, referred to as rol-las in Javanese (short for rohing kawelasan), means the spirit of love. Thus the 12 is made up of the Panca Pama (five bases for conducting one's life) plus the seven lessons for controlling the spirit.
- The cloud or wave located in the middle of the logo symbolizes the struggle to tame the self. It shows the ups and downs of interacting with the surrounding environment and people.
- White represents emptiness, innocence, the beginning and the end. The white appears as a circle in the symbol which the seagull is flying towards. To reach this goal, the seagull must fly through all the other components of the symbol.
