= Beksi =

Beksi Silat is one of the most popular traditional martial arts (Betawi: maen pukul) of the Betawinese. This kuntao-silat hybrid style was originally developed in Kampung Dadap, a village in Kosambi district of Tangerang Regency, Banten Province, Indonesia. The founder of this style combined elements of his ancestral Chinese martial arts with the silat knowledge he received from his Betawi teachers. The style spread through his disciples to the coastal Betawinese and the Benteng Chinese around Kampung Dadap. Eventually, the silat style also reached Petukangan Selatan in South Jakarta and Batujaya in Tangerang.

== Etymology ==
Opinions on the origin of the term Beksi vary. According to silat researcher G.J. Nawi, the term evolved from the phrase Bhe Si, which means 'horse stance' in Hokkien.

== History ==
Beksi Silat was originally created by Lie Tjeng Hok, a peranakan Chinese farmer who created a unique mixed martial art that combined elements from his family's martial arts and Betawinese martial arts. His Betawinese martial arts masters are recorded as Ki Jidan and Ki Miah (also spelled Ki Maimah).

Lie Tjeng Hok taught the martial arts to his students, the Peranakan Chinese, and the coastal Betawinese around his home in Kampung Dadap, Kosambi, Tangerang. One of his most talented Betawinese students was Ki Muharli (or Marhali). Ki Muharli then had a Peranakan-Betawinese disciple named H. Gozali (or Godjalih) bin H. Gatong, who then taught his knowledge to his students in Petukangan, South Jakarta and in Batujaya, Batuceper, Tangerang. The main disciples of H. Gozali included Kong H. Hasbullah bin Misin, Kong M. Nur, Kong Simin, and Kong Mandor Minggu - who also studied with Ki Muharli. Among others, Lie Djie Tong and his successors were those who continue to teach this style in the vicinity of Kampung Dadap. From these places, the Beksi Silat styles spread throughout Greater Jakarta.

It is estimated that there are at least 120 Beksi Silat clubs in the Jabodetabek area that participated in the Girli and Beksi Village Festival 2016 in the village of Batusari, in Batuceper, Tangerang.

== Forms ==
=== Basic forms ===
Generally, Beksi Silat schools teach 12 basic forms or moves (Betawi: jurus), each of which has its own advanced forms (Betawi: kembangan). According to four grandmasters of Beksi schools in Petukangan, although there are differences in names and sequences, most schools teach at least 3 basic forms with the same names and sequences, namely: 1. Beksi, 2. Gedig, 3. Tancep.

=== Form names ===
Below are the form names of the Beksi Silat, according to Eddy Wijaya (H. Oki):

1. Loco Buni (Pukulan Celentang)
2. Goleng (Ngeles/Menghindar)
3. Bandut Atas - Bandut Bawah
4. Singkur Kiri - Singkur Kanan
5. Tiles (Pukul Kanan)
6. Jejek Kaki
7. Raub, or Saub (for hands)
8. Dedak Kuda ke Tanah
9. Tangkis
10. Sikut Belakang - Sikut Depan
11. Kibas Luar
12. Tangkep Dalem - Tangkep Luar
13. Kepret (down to the side and to the front with the fingers)
14. Totok (with a finger to the face)
15. Jurus Cabut Pisau
16. Jurus Pedang Tangan Kosong
17. Jurus Pedang Serangkai
18. Jurus Bangau Terbang
19. Jurus Ganden
20. Jurus Toya (Jurus Toya 1 - Jurus Toya 2)
21. Susul (Dobel Pukulan)
22. Baduk Kebo
23. Tekuk Saub

In addition, there is also a mentioned Beksi move which uses the foot, called Sam Kauw or Resiah Sembilan.

== Schools' lineage ==
Ki Jidan	Ki Maih	Lie A Djam
Lie Tjeng Hok
Ki Muharli	Lie Tong San	Lie Loen Nio	The Tong Sie	Lim A Poh	Lim A Liong	Ouw Wa Wah	Yo Kie Liong	Thio Eng Lim	Yo Eng Kiat
H. Gozali	Lie Do Ton	Lie Djie Te	Lie Djie Tong	Tjeng San	To Liang
Simin	M. Nur	H. Hasbullah	Mandor Minggu	Eddy Wijaya (H. Oki)	Suhanto	Suhandi	Ali

== See also ==
- Pencak Silat
- Indonesian martial arts
