= Tekpi =

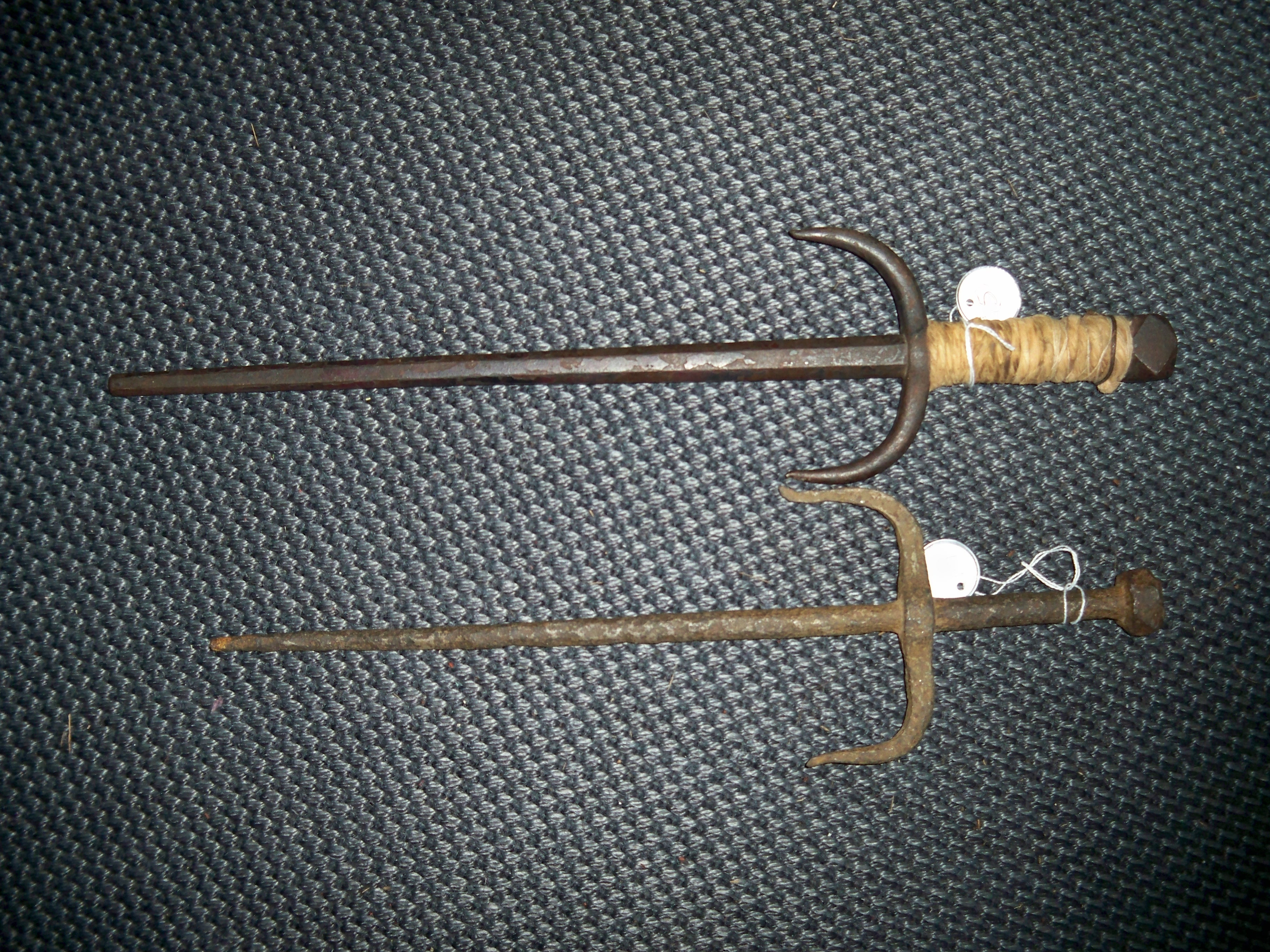
- Two antique weapons. Below is the smaller Indonesian tekpi and above is the Okinawan sai.
- Type: Pointed melee weapon
- Place of origin: Unknown (possibly Indonesia or India)

The tekpi is a pointed melee weapon from Southeast Asia. Known as tekpi in Malay, it is called chabang or cabang (Dutch spelling: tjabang meaning "branch") in Indonesian, siang tépi (雙短鞭 lit. 'double short whip') in Hokkien, and trisul (ตรีศูล lit. 'trident') in Thai. It consists of a pointed metal main prong, two shorter metal side prongs, a one-handed hilt, and a blunt metal pommel, giving it the appearance of a small trident of sorts. More than a weapon, the tekpi was also an important Hindu-Buddhist symbol. It is similar to the Okinawan sai.

== Description ==
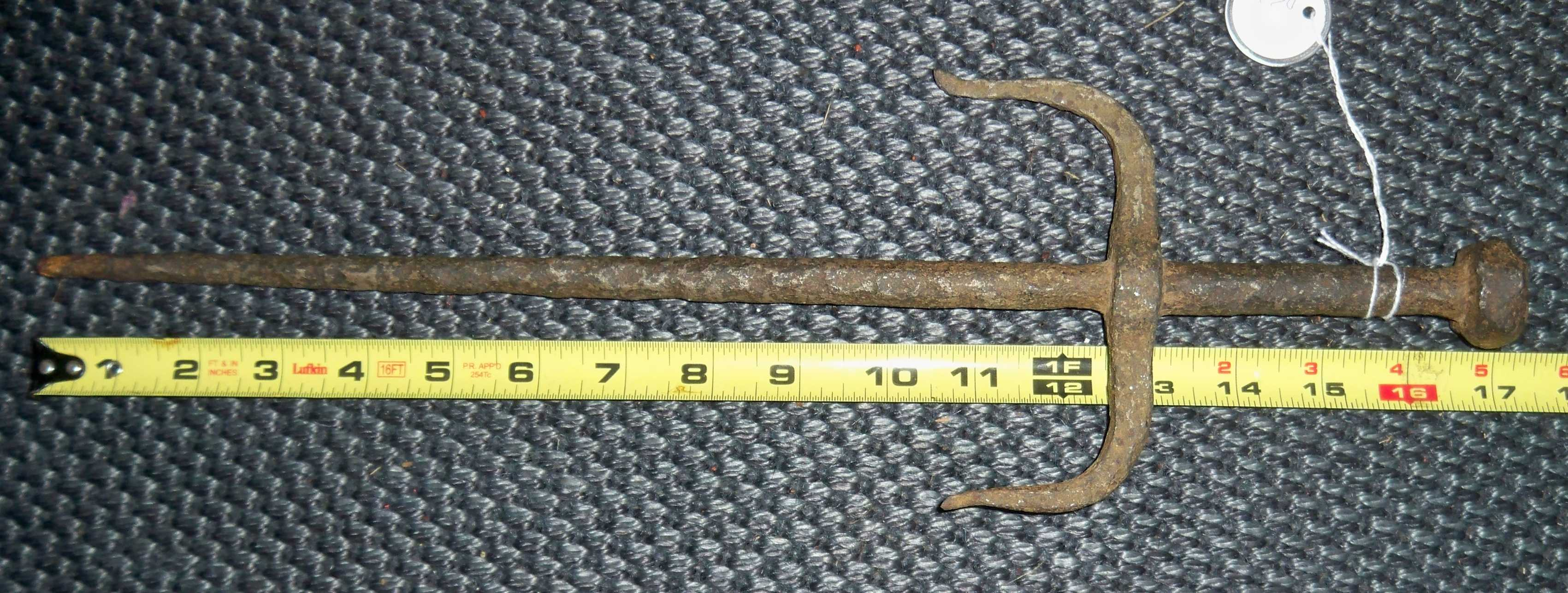

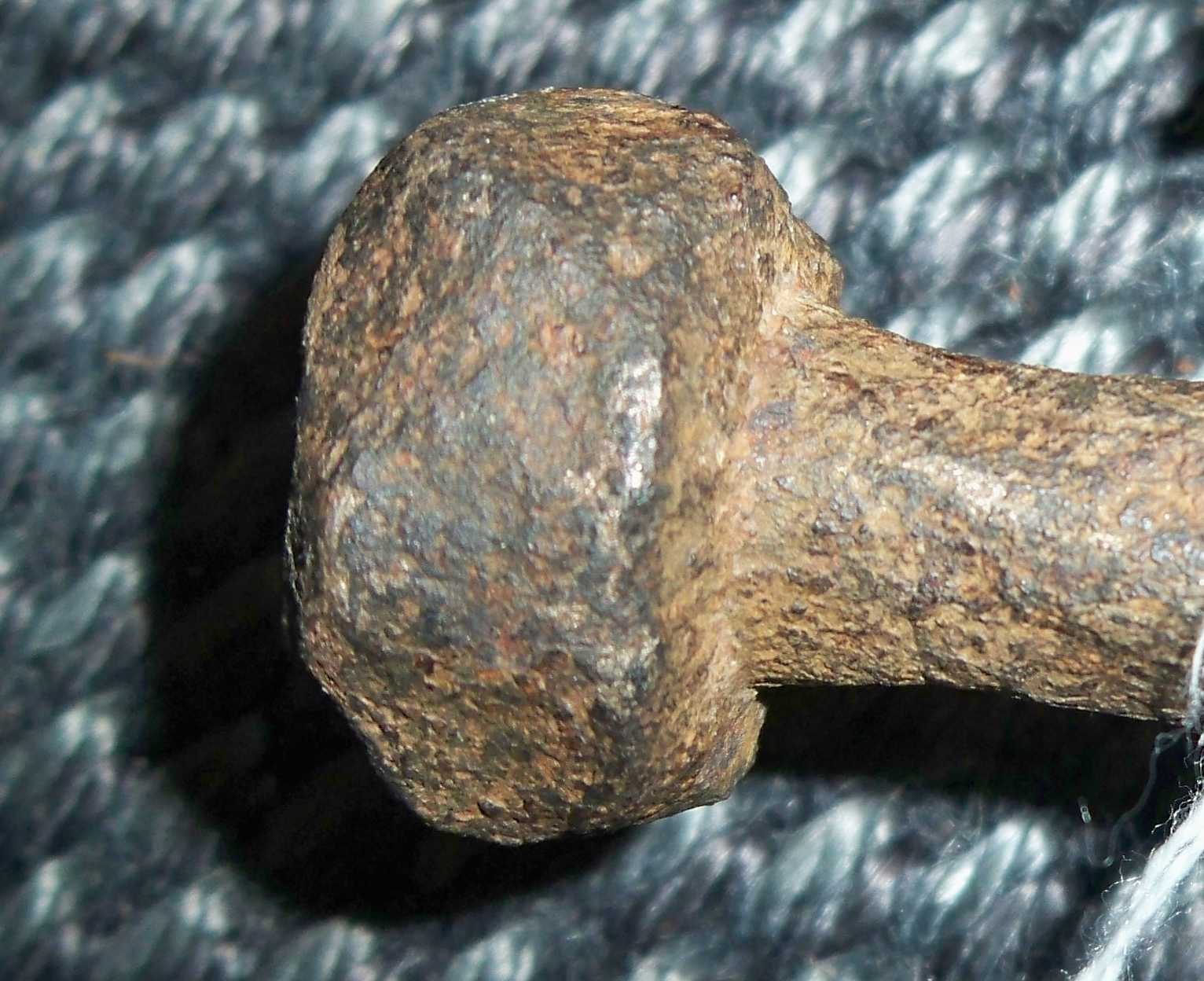
Side view of the pommel

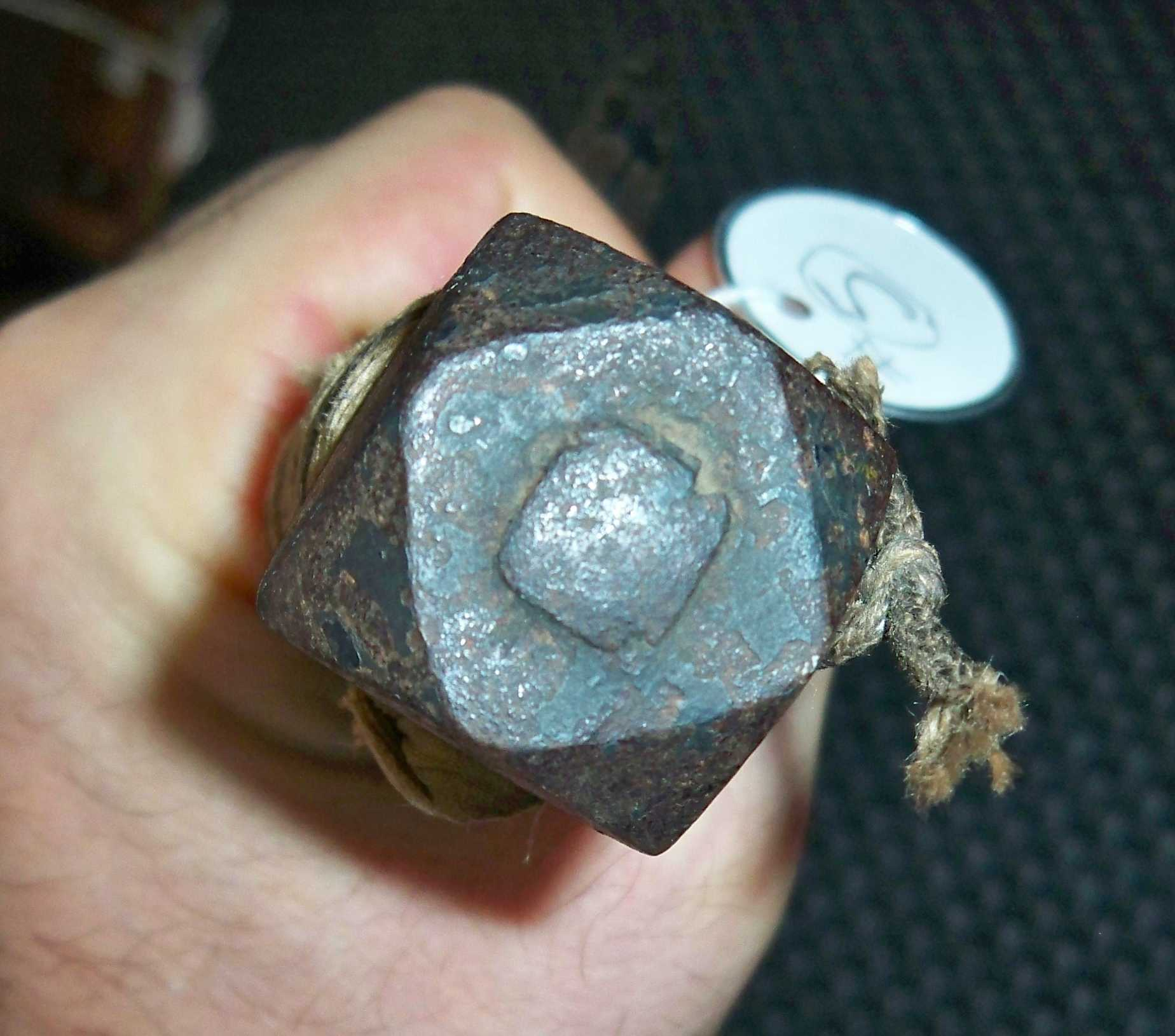
Front view of the pommel

The tekpi consists of a pointed metal main prong, that projects from a one-handed grip, two shorter metal side prongs, which project from the opposite sides of the base of the main prong and point in the same direction as it, and a blunt metal pommel, that attaches to the bottom of the grip. The two side prongs are usually curved to further facilitate disarming opponents from their weapons. The length of the tekpi ranges from 12 in to 19 in (30 cm to 49 cm).

== History ==
The tekpi is believed by some to have been derived from the ancient Indian trishula, a trident which can be either long or short-handled. The tekpi itself is occasionally referred to as a trisula, especially in Indonesia. The earliest evidence of the tekpi comes from Srivijaya in Indonesia where it was originally used defensively like a shield. this tekpi was used by the nobles of the palace. Other sources propose that it was brought to Southeast Asia from China, but the tekpi in Sumatra and Malay Peninsula predates its earliest known use in China and it seems unlikely for the Chinese to introduce an Indian weapon to a region already heavily influenced by the culture of India. Use of the tekpi probably spread with the influence of Indian religion and eventually reached Malaysia, China, Thailand, and other parts of Indochina.

== Technique ==
Tekpi is a weapon typically wielded in pairs, with one in each hand. It is utilized just like its shape would suggest, as it is a weapon used for fast stabs and strikes similar to a knife or a kris. But it is quite versatile and can be used in other ways as well. Defensively, the tekpi is useful at effectively countering bladed weapons. The two side prongs can be used to catch the opponent's weapon and block or entrap it, or to even disarm the opponent of it completely. When rotated so that the point of the main prong is facing towards the user's elbow, the pommel could be used to deliver powerful blows, while the main prong is kept against the forearm to block attacks. When not in use, the tekpi are hung at the waist.

== See also ==
- Sai (weapon)
- Trishula
- Weapons of silat
