= The Deed of Death =

2019 Malaysian martial arts action film

The Deed of Death Geran
- Directed by: Areel Abu Bakar
- Written by: Hafiz Derani; Areel Abu Bakar
- Starring: Namron; Khoharullah; Feiyna Tajudin; Fad Anuar; Azlan Komeng
- Cinematography: Areel Abu Bakar
- Edited by: Nik Johan
- Music by: Bajai
- Production companies: Layar Pictures; Tree of Hope Productions
- Distributed by: Empire Film Solution
- Release dates: 10 October 2019 (Malaysia, Brunei)
- Running time: 101 minutes
- Country: Malaysia
- Languages: Malay (in Kedah Malay dialect)

The Deed of Death, or known as Geran, is a 2019 Malaysian Malay-language martial arts action film directed by Areel Abu Bakar. Showcasing the traditional Malay silat martial art, it tells the story of two siblings in a silat family who has to rescue their younger brother from the criminal gang, and reclaim their family grant stolen.

It is released on 10 October 2019 in Malaysia and Brunei. The film received praise for its fast-paced silat action sequences.

== Plot ==
In a family of practicing silat Gayong, two siblings Ali and Fatimah are frustrated with their reckless younger brother, Mat Arip, as he fails to return home with the grant of their family land. Mat Arip takes part in illegal gambling and racing, and has loaned the land as collateral for his gambling debts to the loan shark criminal Haji Daud. Haji Daud, a long-time enemy of their father, silat coach Pak Nayan, now exact vengeance to the family. The family must fight and race against time to save their brother who is held hostage by the criminal gang and reclaim the family land grant.

== Cast ==
- Namron as Pak Nayan
- Khoharullah Majid as Ali
- Feiyna Tajudin as Fatimah
- Fad Anuar as Mat Arip
- Azlan Komeng as Kahar
- Taiyuddin Bakar as Mi Piang
- Megat Sharizal as Man Bangla
- Aeril Zafrel as Lah
- Niezam Zaidi as Asan
- Adam Shahz as At
- Kasturi Majid as Tora King
- Sham Majid as Yon
- Yusran Hashim as Chot
- Abinoorizuadin as Pak Teh
- Faizal Hussein as Haji Daud
- Fatimah Abu Bakar as Haryati, narrator

== Production ==
This film showing the art of gayong martial arts from the Gayong Pusaka Organization. This film does not use the stuntmen.The actors perform their own actions because they are experienced in silat or real martial artists. The film's dialogue is in Kedah dialect Malay, with standard Malaysian subtitles provided.

== Future ==
The title for the prequel of Geran was revealed as Abang while the title for the sequel to Geran was revealed as Geran 2 (also known as The Deed of Death 2)
