= Silat Pattani =

- Also known as: Silat Tua, Silat Tua Yawi, Silat Patani
- Country of origin: Thailand
- Olympic sport: No

Silat Patani (Thai: silat Pattani, Malay: silat Patani) is a style of silat originating in the Pattani kingdom, now a state of Thailand. It is primarily practiced in northern Malaysia and southern Thailand. The art is also known as silat tua (old silat) because tradition credits it as the oldest form of silat Melayu. It is sometimes called silat tua Yawi, being the Thai-Malay pronunciation of Jawi in this case referring to the Thai Malay community. These two latter names are increasingly popular among Malaysian practitioners, so as not to acknowledge the Pattani origin of the art.

== History ==
The founder of Silat Pattani is referred to as pendeta guru from the Sanskrit terms pandit and guru. The exact age of the art is unknown but it is believed to date back to the Hindu-Buddhist era. It incorporates four elemental forms like Chinese xingyiquan and several forms based on the Indian Ramayana, indicating influence from both countries. One origin story tells of three brothers getting lost in the forest. One brother named Yuso took refuge in a tree to be safe from tigers. While in the tree, he watched an elder tiger teach its young how to move as a predator and avoid capture. Yuso recounted the movements to his brothers and together they created a new fighting system.

== Basic concepts ==
=== Jantan Betina ===
Jantan betina literally means "male-female" and is the Malay concept of opposites. It also refers to the concept of relativity wherein hard is only harder than something that is softer but is softer than something that is harder. Jantan is represented by hard, fierce, fast actions while betina is slow, subtle and soft. The two opposing forces are dynamic – never in perfect balance but constantly changing from one into the other by leading or following, forcing or flowing. In silat practice, this means that one force must be met with its opposite. A strong attack may be defended with a soft, evasive response but heavy and powerful actions might be useful against a yielding, subtler opponent. For this reason, fighters must be able to instantly change from strong to gentle. Jantan and betina must also complement each other so that, for example, when the dominant hand is high the other is low or when one palm faces up the other faces down, etc.

=== Panchabuta ===
According to Malay metaphysical theory, which borrows heavily from Vedic Hindu concepts, the universe is composed of five elements (panchabuta): fire, earth, water, wind and the intangible fifth element of angkasa (space or ether). The body is a miniature of the cosmos with each element corresponding to one of the body's functions. Water is blood and the bodily fluids; fire is the senses of sight and hearing; earth is the flesh, muscle and bone while wind is the respiratory system. Training the four elements is believed to bring practitioners into alignment with the cosmos. This begins by focusing on one or all of the elements in turn during meditation. Hand position varies depending on the element but all are done either in the half lotus or preferably the full lotus position. Element meditation is followed by a string of freestyle techniques reflecting the four elements, performed either seated or while standing. Each element can be explored in infinite manifestations. For example, wind might be a gentle breeze or a tornado. However, the elements tend to be identified with certain qualities. Fire techniques are fast with sudden twists and changes of height. Wind involves jumping movements and acrobatic leaps. Earth is expressed through solid stances and strong attacks. Soft and fluid moves represent water.

== Forms ==
Forms which are performed solo are called tari while those done with a partner are called silat pulut. Such training allows for the learning of various techniques and applications without having to teach set moves.

=== Ramayana forms ===
Having been founded by ascetics, silat is closely tied to Hindu-Buddhist philosophy and legend. As with other Southeast Asian martial arts, Silat Pattani contains sets based on characters from the Ramayana (Malay:Hikayat Seri Rama, Thai:Ramakien). Called Tari Ramayana, these forms require the practitioner to not only mimic the characters' movements but their mannerisms as well. Three figures are of particular importance in Silat Pattani.

Seri Rama: Imitates Rama shooting an arrow, searching for it and then retrieving it. This set is characterised by a straight back and confident movements in imitation of Rama's regal bearing. It is often recommended for improving the posture of students who are prone to hunching too much.

Sita Dewi: Mimics Sita's coyness and femininity. The specialty of this form is a technique where the thumb touches the first two fingers which can be used to block and parry as well as attack. Movements are short and economical, allowing for easy retreat. Attacks are aimed at the vital points. Sita's style is epitomised by the kerambit, a claw-like knife that Malay women would wear in their hair.

Hanuman: The monkey king Hanuman is famous for his strength. This set is unpredictable and combines agile leaping escapes with attacks that are both hard and fast. Hanuman's weapon is the gedak (mace).

=== Animal forms ===
One teaching states that a silat Pattani practitioner should have the agility of a deer, the strength of a tiger and the mystic abilities of a dragon. Before starting this training, practitioners assume the proper frame of mind by performing movements that embody the respective animal. Silat Pattani contains six animal sets which can be done empty-handed or with weapons. Some animals are emulated in more than one form.

Animal forms of Silat Pattani
English	Kelantan Malay
Deer	Ruso	The most basic animal form. Used for leaping into or out of attack.
Monkey	Kero/Beruk	Follows the speed, agility and spontaneity of a monkey.
Snake	Ular	Features both hard and soft techniques, sometimes practiced with blades to represent fangs.
Bird	Burung	Includes eagle (hele), fighter cock (aye nyabung) and crane (bangau) styles.
Tiger	Rima	Students first learn the limping tiger form named Tok Che Po before progressing to the tiger set proper, which must begin and end with meditation to control the animal's power.
Dragon	Nago	The most advanced animal set. Uses limbs to lock the opponent, mimicking a dragon wrapping its body around an adversary.

== Weapons ==
Practitioners begin weapon training after they've learned the fundamentals of empty handed fighting. The stick, machete, sarong, spear and kris are the five basic weapons. Unlike later silat styles which favour the kris as their main weapon, it is regarded as the least useful weapon in silat Pattani and is therefore taught last.

- Kayu/ Bate (stick)
- Pare (machete/broadsword)
- Chindai/ Samping (sarong)
- Tombok/ Lembing (spear)
- Keris (dagger)
- Kerambit (tiger-claw knife)
- Gedak (mace)

== See also ==
- Silat Melayu
- Tomoi
- Bando
- Bokator
- Silambam
- Wuxingquan
- Xingyiquan
