= Seni gayong =

Martial arts style

Seni Gayong
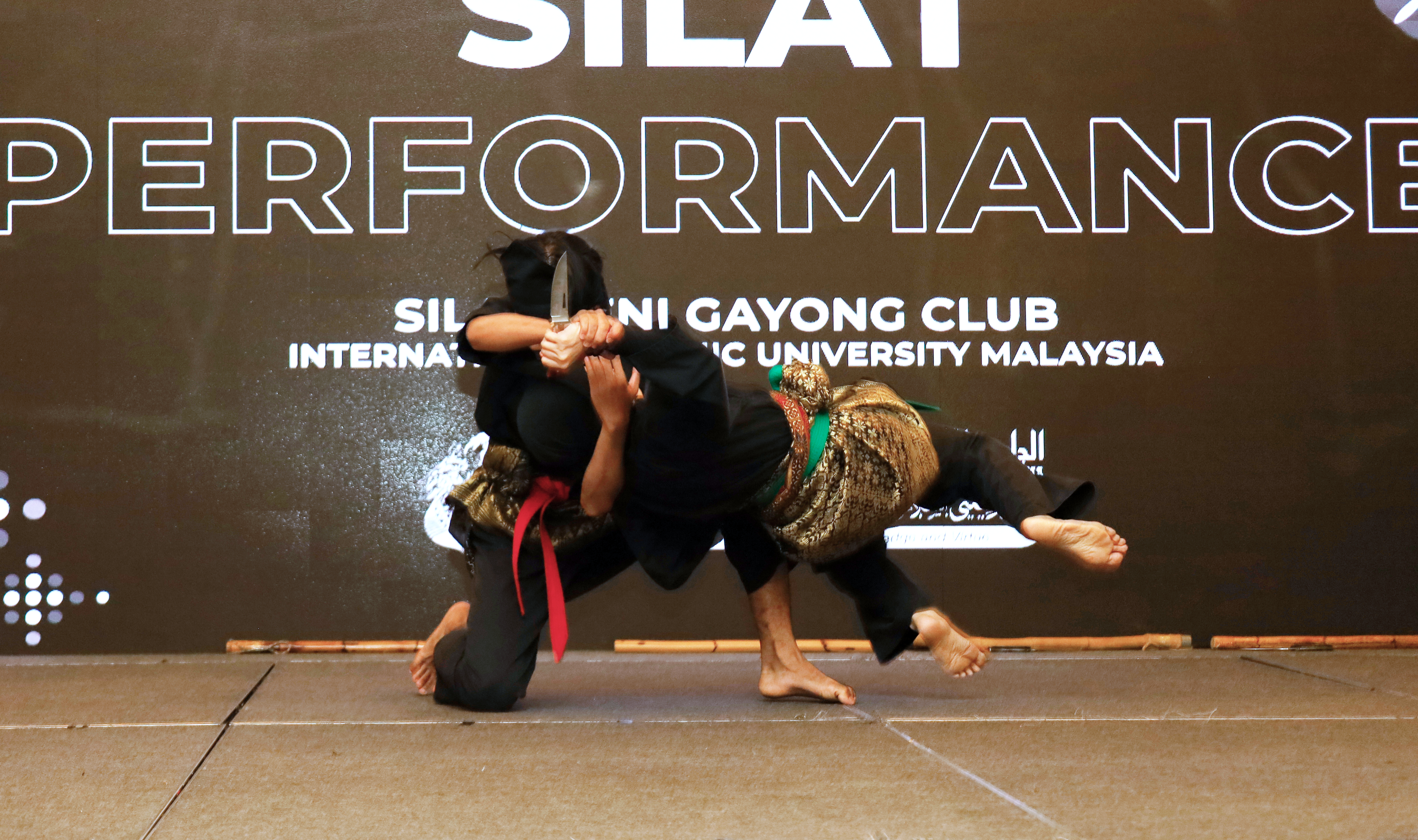
- Also known as: Seni Gayung
- Hardness: Semi-contact
- Country of origin: Singapore, Malaysia
- Creator: Almarhum Dato’ Meor Abdul Rahman bin Daeng Uda Md. Hashim
- Olympic sport: No
- Official website: www.gayong.com.my/pssgm/

Seni Gayong is a style of silat originating from Pulau Sudong in Singapore and widely practiced in Malaysia and Singapore. It was the first martial arts association to be registered in the Malaysia, and is now the biggest and most internationally known Malay silat discipline. Gayong is overseen by the Pertubuhan Silat Seni Gayong Malaysia (PSSGM) or the Malaysian Silat Seni Gayong Organisation. This organisation is currently led by Dato' Ismail Jantan. While it is most popular in Malaysia and Singapore, there are also branches in Vietnam, Australia, France, Kuwait, Tunisia, Britain, and the United States.

== History ==
Seni Gayong originated among the Bugis people of Sulawesi in Indonesia who had migrated to Singapore and Malaysia and was called Silat Sendi Harimau. Literally meaning "tiger joint silat", the system utilised the tiger claw technique to lock opponents' joints. The Bugis prince Daeng Kuning, descended from a long line of warriors, brought the style to the Malay Peninsula in the 1800s. It was eventually passed down to his great-grandson Meor Abdul Rahman. The teaching of Seni Gayong, as with most styles of silat, was once restricted to relatively few students under each master. In 1942 during the Japanese occupation, Meor Abdul Rahman taught Seni Gayong publicly in Pulau Sudong, Singapore when the locals feared an attack by the Japanese. Having inherited the art from his grandfather; Syed Zainal Abidin Al-Attas, Dato Meor Abdul Rahman eventually founded Malaysia's first martial arts association, Pertubuhan Silat Seni Gayong Malaysia. It was and still remains the method of unarmed combat taught to the Royal Malaysia Police force

== Training ==
Seni Gayong incorporates strikes, grabs, joint manipulation, and weaponry. Acrobatics are also included but are comparatively less than other styles of silat. The curriculum is divided into the following stages:

Tapak Gayong

The student begins by learning foundation stances and footwork patterns or tapak along with basic punches, kicks, blocks, counterattacks and reversals.

Seni Tapak Gayong

After learning the basic forms of attacking and defending, the student is next taught seizing techniques, takedowns and how to manipulate, lock or strike the opponent's joints.

Seni Keris

Having becoming proficient in unarmed techniques, the student is ready for training with weapons. The first weapons taught include the kris (dagger), pisau (knife), kerambit (claw-like knife), kapak (axe), tekpi (three-pronged truncheon) and sundang (sword).

Seni Simbat

More weapons are introduced, namely the tongkat (staff), simbat (short stick), tembong (long stick), parang (machete), tombak (spear) and lembing (javelin).

Seni Cindai

Flexible weapons are taught. These are traditionally taught last because they require their flexible nature requires the wielder to have great control to use them skillfully. Moreover, many of these weapons would be near useless in the hands of an inexperienced fighter when compared to a more lethal sword or knife. The weapons taught in this component are the tali (rope), cindai (silk scarf or cloth), rantai (chain), and bengkong (cloth belt).

Seni Yoi

Having learned to fight armed and unarmed, the student is now taught fast and nimble movements to dodge or confuse the opponent. This may also include various athletic moves. In the past, this stage was comparable to Chinese qinggong, but today it consists mostly of deceptive attacking techniques.

Seni Belian

Belian is an old Javanese word for a dukun who has died and taken the form of a tiger spirit. This stage focuses on spiritual and internal training. With the rise of Islamic conservatism in Southeast Asia today, esoteric aspects of silat are either downplayed or re-interpreted to fit into modern religious thought. However, the traditional seni belian is based more strongly on indigenous Indonesian kejawen rather than the Muslim faith.

== Weapons ==
Seni Gayong makes use of a variety of weapons, some of which may not be included in the mandatory syllabus. Trainees begin weapons-training by learning the use of the kris. Other small easily learned weapons follow, before progressing to long weapons and finally the more difficult flexible weapons. Cloth weapons like the chindai and bengkong are considered the most advanced of all weapons. Seni Gayong as taught to the police and special forces may replace some traditional weapons with modern knives, brass knuckles (buku lima) or even firearms for reasons of practicality. The traditional tonfa is retained, however, as its techniques can be applied to the T-baton used in law enforcement.

== Progression ==
Seni Gayong adopts the modern Japanese coloured belt system to indicate students' progress. The bengkong or waist sash is used for this purpose, and the passing of a test is required before a student can progress to the next stage. Trainees under the age of 12 go through separate stages than older students. These are as follows:

Adult (above 12 years old)

01. Hitam Mulus (black)

02. Awan Putih (white)

03. Pelangi Hijau (green)

04. Pelangi Merah (red)

05. Pelangi Merah Cula I (red with 1 yellow stripe)

06. Pelangi Merah Cula II (red with 2 yellow stripes)

07. Pelangi Merah Cula III (red with 3 yellow stripes)

08. Pelangi Kuning (yellow)

09. Pelangi Kuning Cula I (yellow with 1 black stripe)

10. Pelangi Kuning Cula II (yellow with 2 black stripes)

11. Pelangi Kuning Cula III (yellow with 3 black stripes)

12. Pelangi Kuning Cula IV (yellow with 4 black stripes)

13. Pelangi Kuning Cula V (yellow with 5 black stripes)

14. Harimau Pelangi Hitam Cula Sakti I (black with 1 yellow stripe) and so on..

15. Harimau Pelangi Hitam Cula Sakti II

16. Harimau Pelangi Hitam Cula Sakti III

17. Harimau Pelangi Hitam Cula Sakti IV

18. Harimau Pelangi Hitam Cula Sakti V

19. Harimau Pelangi Hitam Cula Sakti VI

Children (under 12 years old);

01. Hitam Mulus (black)

02. Awan Putih Cula Hijau (white with a green stripe)

03. Awan Putih Cula Merah (white with a red stripe)

04. Awan Putih Cula Kuning (white with a yellow stripe)

05. Awan Putih Cula Hitam (white with a black stripe)

When a child attains Awan Putih Cula Hitam, they are taken in the same level as Pelangi Hijau.
