= Hikayat Awang Sulung Merah Muda =

Hikayat Awang Sulong Merah Muda (Jawi: حكاية اوڠ سولوڠ ميره مودا) is a classic work of Malay literature originating from the oral storytelling traditions of the Malay world, particularly associated with the state of Kelantan in present-day Malaysia. The hikayat was narrated by the famous storyteller Pawang Ana and later transcribed by Raja Haji Yahya. It was first published in 1907 in Singapore by Sir R. O. Winstedt and A. J. Sturrock through the Methodist Publishing House.

The story belongs to the genre of traditional Malay heroic romances and is regarded as one of the most important examples of Kelantanese oral literature preserved in written form. The narrative combines elements of adventure, royal court intrigue, warfare, supernatural events, disguise, exile, and romance.

== Background ==
Hikayat Awang Sulong Merah Muda originated as part of the oral literary tradition of the Malays. The tale was recited by Pawang Ana, a renowned Malay oral storyteller from Kelantan whose performances became an important source for colonial-era scholars documenting traditional Malay narratives.

The hikayat was recorded and edited by Raja Haji Yahya under the supervision of British administrators and Malay scholars interested in preserving Malay oral traditions. Its publication in 1907 formed part of a wider effort during the early twentieth century to collect and print traditional Malay tales that had previously circulated primarily through oral recitation and handwritten manuscripts.

The text is written in classical Malay and was originally printed in Jawi script.

== Synopsis ==
The hikayat tells the story of Awang Sulong Merah Muda, a prince of extraordinary ability and noble lineage who undergoes numerous trials and adventures. Like many traditional Malay heroic narratives, the story centers upon themes of exile, hidden identity, perseverance, loyalty, and eventual restoration to royal status.

Awang Sulong experiences separation from his family and homeland before embarking on a long journey filled with conflict, encounters with rulers and warriors, and various supernatural or extraordinary events. During parts of the narrative, he conceals his true identity and lives among ordinary people despite his royal origins.

The hikayat also contains episodes involving court politics, battles between kingdoms, romantic relationships, and demonstrations of martial prowess and wisdom. Through his struggles and virtues, Awang Sulong eventually achieves recognition and restoration befitting his noble birth.

== Themes ==
Scholars have noted several recurring themes in the hikayat, including:

- The ideal qualities of Malay kingship and nobility
- Loyalty to family and ruler
- Patience and endurance during hardship
- The concealment and later revelation of true identity
- Divine destiny and supernatural assistance
- Heroism and martial valor
- Courtly etiquette and aristocratic conduct

The work also reflects traditional Malay cosmology and social values found in other classical hikayat literature.

== Literary significance ==
Hikayat Awang Sulong Merah Muda is considered an important example of traditional Malay oral literature and Kelantanese storytelling culture. The text is frequently studied in discussions of Malay folklore, classical literature, and oral narrative traditions.

The hikayat is especially notable because it preserves the storytelling style associated with Pawang Ana, whose oral narratives were among the most influential sources for the documentation of Malay folk romances in the early twentieth century.

Together with other tales narrated by Pawang Ana, the hikayat contributed significantly to scholarly understanding of Malay oral epic traditions and the transition from oral literature to printed texts during the colonial period.

== Publication history ==
The hikayat was first published in Singapore in 1907 by the Methodist Publishing House. The publication was edited from oral narration by Raja Haji Yahya and overseen by R. O. Winstedt and A. J. Sturrock.

Copies of the work are preserved in libraries and archival collections, including microfilm editions.

== See also ==
- Malay literature
- Hikayat
- Pawang Ana
- Jawi script
- Richard Olaf Winstedt
