= Mek Mulung =

- Medium: Theatre, music, dance
- Originating culture: Kedah (Malaysia)

Mek Mulung
- UNESCO Intangible Cultural Heritage
- Country: Malaysia
- Reference: 01610
- Region: Asia and the Pacific

Inscription history
- Inscription: 2023 (18th session)
- List: Need of Urgent Safeguarding

Mek Mulung (Jawi: مق مولوڠ) is a traditional Malay theatre that is unique to the northwest state of Kedah in Malaysia. It became popular since the late 18th century and incorporates most elements of Mak Yong, Menora and Hadrah. The theatre features a repertoire of stories from local legends, which according to a source, amounted about 20 original stories, with few of them survived today. Similar to Mak Yong, the stories are presented through dialogue, song and dance.

The musicians and actors of the theatre are exclusively male, playing both male and female roles. The basic dance movements are limited, abbreviated, crude and mainly focus on the arms, especially the to-and-fro, and up and down swinging.

The orchestra of Mek Mulung is predominantly percussive and consists of rebana, gong and kecerek (concussion sticks). A small oboe, the only melodic instruments in the orchestra, complements other instruments. The musicians also do the singing, typically in syllabic style, with little vocal ornamentation.

The performance normally begins with a ritual known as bertabuh where all musical instruments will be played simultaneously. Then, an opening song called bertabik will be sung in group and accompanied by dancing movements. There are up to 7 types of dance in Mek Mulung:

1. Tarian Sembah
2. Tarian Gambang
3. Tarian Puteri Mabuk
4. Tarian Anak Menora
5. Tarian Sirama
6. Tarian Puteri Masuk Bilik Air
7. Tarian Sedayung

The singing of bertabik then followed by the recitation of stories from Hikayats by Pak Mulung, and roles from the stories will be visualised by actors performance. The transition between scenes in the stories will be marked with a singing and pantun exchange. The theatre is typically performed in series and can take up to 3 nights to complete.
