= Silat =

Southeast Asian martial art

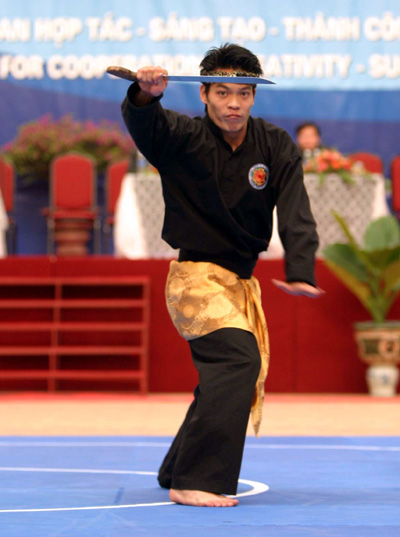
- A Vietnamese pesilat armed with golok
- Focus: Self-defense
- Hardness: Full-contact, semi-contact, light-contact
- Country of origin: Brunei, Indonesia (as Pencak Silat), Malaysia, Singapore, southern Thailand, southern Philippines, and southern Vietnam
- Olympic sport: No

Silat
- UNESCO Intangible Cultural Heritage
- Country: Malaysia
- Reference: 01504
- Region: Asia and the Pacific

Inscription history
- Inscription: 2019 (14th session)
- List: Representative
- Martial arts, sport, bladed weapons, technical skills, choreography, costumes and moral values

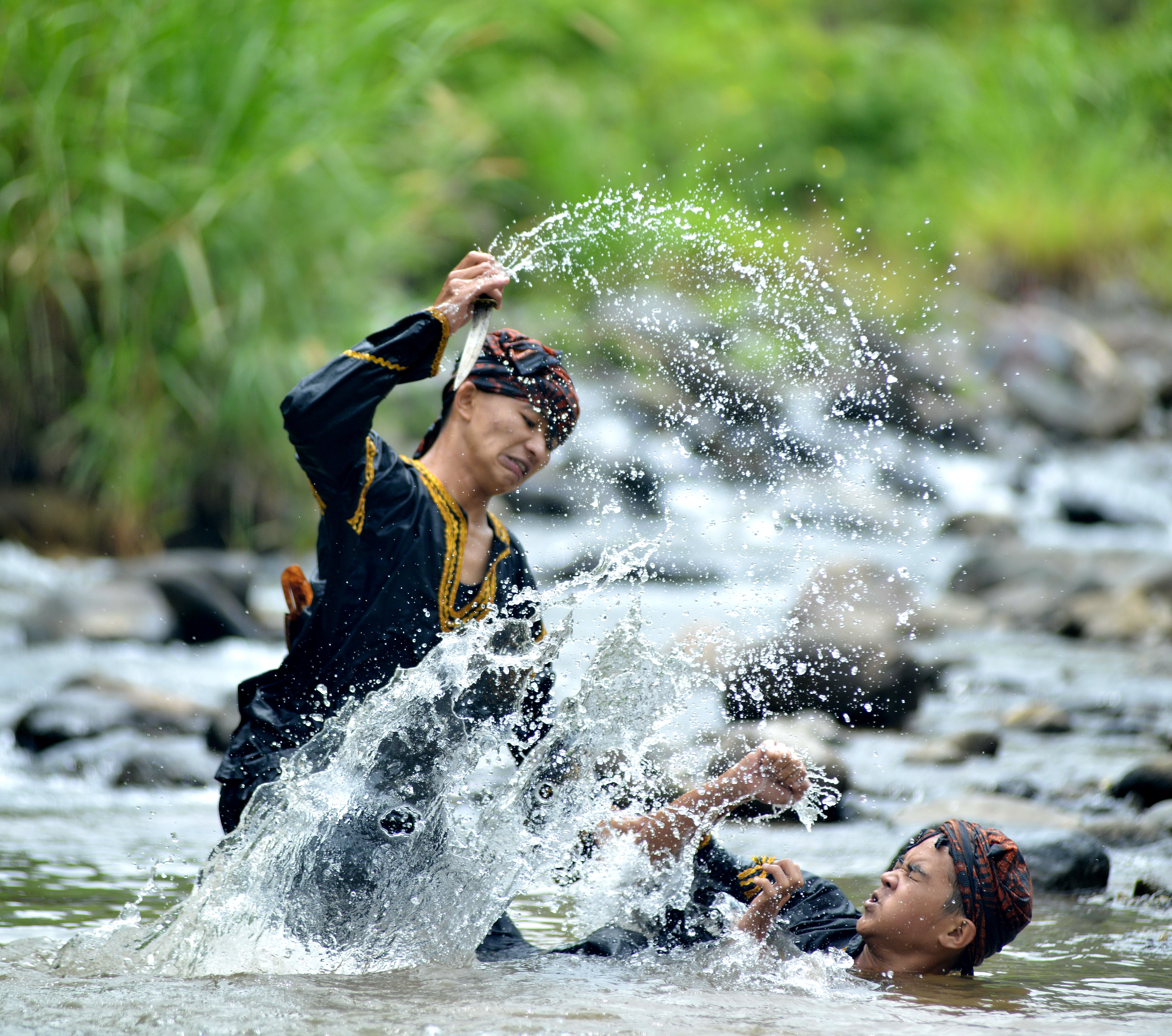
A demonstration of the Minangkabau style of silat.

Silat is the collective term for a class of martial arts from the Malay and surrounding geocultural areas of Southeast Asia. It is traditionally practised in Brunei, Indonesia, Malaysia, Singapore, southern Thailand, southern Philippines and southern Vietnam. There are hundreds of different styles (aliran) and schools (perguruan) which tend to focus either on strikes, joint manipulation, weaponry, or some combination thereof.

The word silat is used by Malay speakers throughout Southeast Asia, but it is officially called pencak silat in Indonesia. The term pencak silat has been adopted globally in reference to professional competitive silat for sport, similar to the Chinese word wushu. Regional dialect names include penca (West Java), dika or padik (Thailand), silek (the Minangkabau pronunciation of silat), main-po or maen po (in the lower speech of Sundanese), and gayong or gayung (used in parts of Malaysia and Sumatra).

Pencak silat is one of the sports included in the Southeast Asian Games and other region-wide competitions. Pencak silat first made its debut at the 1987 Southeast Asian Games and the 2018 Asian Games, both of which were held in Indonesia. Training halls are overseen by separate national organisations in each of the main countries the art is practised. These organisations are Ikatan Pencak Silat Indonesia (IPSI) in Indonesia, Persekutuan Silat Kebangsaan Malaysia (PESAKA) in Malaysia, Persekutuan Silat Brunei Darussalam (PERSIB) in Brunei, and Persekutuan Silat Singapura (PERSISI) in Singapore. Its practitioners are called pesilat.

Both pencak silat and silat were recognized as intangible cultural heritage by UNESCO in December 2019.

== Etymology ==
The origin of the word silat is uncertain. The Malay term silat is linked to Minangkabau Indonesia word silek, thus a Sumatran origin of the term is likely. It possibly related to silambam, the Tamil martial art which has been recorded as being practiced in Malaysia since at least the fifteenth century in Malacca. The preset forms of silambam are known as silatguvarisai. According to Malaysian source, the word 'silat' is said to originate from the Arabic word 'silah' (سِلَاح) meaning 'weapon' or 'silah' (صِلَةُ) meaning 'connection'. The most popular theory in Malaysia is that it derives from sepantas kilat meaning "as fast as lightning."

Other theories derive silat from the Sanskrit śīla meaning morality or principle, or the Southern Chinese saula (手拉) which means to push or perform with the hands. The Sanskrit theory is particularly popular in Thailand, as sila is an alternate form of the word silat in that country. Other similar-sounding words have been proposed, but are generally not considered by etymologists. One example is si elat which means someone who confuses, deceives or bluffs. A similar term, ilat, means an accident, misfortune or a calamity. Yet another similar-sounding word is silap meaning wrong or error. Some styles contain a set of techniques called Silap Langkah designed to lead the opponent into making a mistake. It's not very easy

In its proper usage in the languages of its origin, silat is often a general term for any fighting style. This is still common in Indonesia where in some regions both silat and kuntao are traditionally interchangeable.

== Origins ==
=== Legend ===
A number of stories exist detailing the history of particular styles, which are often used as origin myths for silat in general. One such tale is of a woman named Rama Sukana who witnessed a fight between a tiger and a large hawk. By using the animals' movements, she was able to fend off a group of drunken men that attacked her. She then taught the techniques to her husband, Rama Isruna, from whom they were formally passed down. There are several variations of this story depending on the region where it is told. On the island of Bawean, Rama Sukana is believed to have watched monkeys fighting each other while the Sundanese of West Java believe that she saw a monkey battle a tiger.

The legend in the Malay Peninsula is where the heroine is named Timah. The daughter of a raja in the Indonesian Archipelago, her husband is a possessive man named Uma. In this version, Timah tries to scare away a white-rumped shama or murai batu (more than one of them in some versions) that flies at her as she bathes. With each move the bird makes, she attempts to wave it off with her hands, and spins as it flies around her. Rather than fighting off drunken men, Timah fends off her own husband who tries to beat her with a stick for taking so long. The fact that this legend attributes silat to a woman reflects the prominence of women in traditional Southeast society, as can still be seen in the matriarchal adat perpatih customs of West Sumatra.

Another legend tells of three Minangkabau warriors from West Sumatra, Indonesia. By their masters' instruction, the young men were travelling north in the hope of attaining moksha (enlightenment). On their journey, they were caught up in a bloody battle near the Thai border. One of the three was wounded but managed to escape into a forest. Following a stream, he reached a waterfall where he stopped to rest. The warrior noticed a lotus flower come down the waterfall but even as it was pushed below the surface by the waterfall, the lotus would float back up completely intact. The warrior tried throwing a stone and then a stick at the lotus, both with the same result. Finally he went into the water and tried slashing at it with his sword but the lotus would only swirl away, still unharmed. The exhausted warrior then fell into the water and upon climbing out, he contemplated how this principle of overcoming the hard with the soft could be applied to battle. He subsequently created a method of silat with his two compatriots. This story is often told in the Malay Peninsula either as the origin of a particular lineage or to explain the spread of silat from the Minangkabau heartland into mainland Southeast Asia. A Minangkabau-style silat called silek minang influenced the style of silat in Negeri Sembilan in the Malay Peninsula.

The time period for this tale is generally believed to be the 14th century. However, a later version with a more Islamic setting places it during the 17th century. In this version, the three men are named Burhanuddin, Shamsuddin and Aminuddin. Rather than a quest north for enlightenment, they journey to Aceh where Islam has recently been introduced in order to learn more about the new religion. Their status as warriors is not mentioned, nor a battle. Instead, Burhanuddin is filling a water jar when he sees the lotus blossom. He then thought he heard a voice from the tree telling him to teach others what he learned. Upon returning home, each of the three men became religious teachers. This version of the story links it with Burhanuddin Ulakan, a Minangkabau man who studied in Aceh and became the first Muslim preacher in West Sumatra.

=== History ===
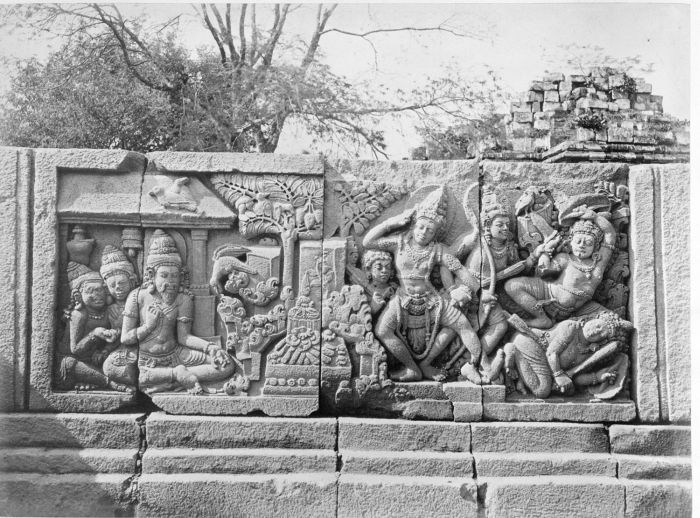
Bas-relief of a battle scene at Prambanan Temple, Indonesia, depicting weapons of the time such as the sword, shield, club, bow, and a kris-like dagger

The silat tradition is mostly oral. In the absence of written records, much of its history is known through myth and archaeological evidence. It is believed that this form of martial arts developed around the developments of Bukit Siguntang Mahameru kingdom in Palembang, Sumatra, Indonesia. As narrated in the Malay Annals, the beginning of the Sumatran empire, started with a story of Paduka Demang Lebar Daun and Sang Sapurba which took place in Batang Musi River. Paduka Demang Lebar Daun was officially styled as the forefather (Mangkubumi) of the Nusantara peoples in Malay archipelago by Sang Sapurba through their oath. From the Bukit Siguntang Kingdom it developed into three full-grown empires in Malay history. One of them is the Pagaruyung Kingdom (West Sumatra, Indonesia) under the rule of King Adityawarman around the 12th century.

The earliest evidence of a more organised silat comes from the Riau-Lingga archipelago, which acted as a land bridge between the Indonesian Archipelago and the Malay Peninsula. Located between Singapore and Sumatra island, the local population gathered great mobility in small boats. The journeys of these sea-nomads regularly extended as far as the Maluku Islands in the east, the Lesser Sunda Islands in the south, and Tenasserim Island in Myanmar. At some point or another they came into contact with the Thais, Malays, Toraja, Han Chinese, Bugis, Moluccans, Madurese, Dayaks, Sulu, Burmese and orang asli until they spread across the Indonesian Archipelago. Their heterogeneous systems of combat are termed silat Melayu. Practiced since at least the 6th century, they formed the basis for the fighting arts of Indonesia, Brunei, Malaysia, Singapore, and Southern Thailand. From its birthplace of Riau, silat quickly spread to the Srivijaya empire and the Minangkabau capital of Pariaman, both powers known for their military might. Srivijaya in particular propagated silat as it extended its rule not only throughout Sumatra but into Java, Borneo, Cambodia, and the Malay Peninsula.

The influence of the Indian subcontinent and Southern China were fundamental to the development of silat. By adopting the Indian faiths of Hinduism and Buddhism, Southeast Asian social structure became more organised. Images of Hindu figures such as Durga, Krishna and scenes from the Ramayana all bear testament to the Indian influence on local weapons and armour. Forms are said to have been introduced by the Buddhist monk Bodhidharma, born in Central Asia or India (5th or 6th century CE), who came to Southeast Asia via the Srivijayan capital of Palembang. Many of silat's medicinal practices and weapons originated in either India or China. The slapping actions in silat jurus (in which the practitioner slaps their own body) are reminiscent of Indian martial arts. Some form of wrestling is indeed portrayed in Indonesian temple art. The martial arts practised by the Chinese community of Southeast Asia are referred to as kuntao.

The Book of Liang mentions a kingdom called Poling or Poli southeast of Guangdong. Thought to be located in the Malay Peninsula, the people of this kingdom are said to have customs identical with Cambodia and the same produce as Siam. Their weapons are purportedly the same as China with the exception of the chakram which locals are said to be highly skilled with. Art associated with the candi of Indonesia displays the weapons of the time. Among the weapons featured in murals are swords, shields, bows, clubs, spears, kris, and halberds. The carved dvarapala (gate guards) found in temples around the region are ogres armed with clubs and swords. Between the 11th and 14th centuries, silat reached its peak under Majapahit. Founded by Raden Wijaya after repelling the Mongols, the empire united all of Indonesia's islands and extended its influence into peninsular Malaysia. Silat was and in some cases still is used by the defence forces of various Southeast Asian kingdoms and states in what are now Indonesia, Malaysia, Singapore, Vietnam, Thailand and Brunei.

Folklore commonly credits the promulgation of silat to pendeta or Hindu-Buddhist sages, often through the study of animals and the natural world. The priests were said to combine the animal movements with meditative postures (semadi) and mystic hand positions (mudra), much like the kuji-in of ninjutsu. The animal-based concept was most likely adopted from Indian martial arts. The village shamans or dukun would often learn silat both as part of their craft and for defending themselves while travelling. Bomoh in some communities such as the Kadayan are required to complete their training in silat before they are initiated. Silat is still an integral aspect of healing rituals such as main puteri. Through this connection, silat is used as a method of spiritual training in addition to self-defense. Systems exist which focus exclusively on the internal rather than the physical, such as the Joduk style of Bali.

Nomadic boat-dwellers in Southeast Asia and southeastern China were often misconstrued as pirates for political reasons, but Faxian and Zhao Rugua both described fierce warriors armed with an arsenal of weapons who would attack passing boats around Singapore, Sumatra, Java, and the South China Sea. Local rulers like Parameswara relied on the local boat-people to maintain control of their territory, and they played a key role in the region's power struggles even into the colonial era. True piracy saw an increase after the arrival of the European colonists, who recorded Malay pirates armed with sabres, kris and spears across the archipelago even into the Gulf of Siam. The Haijin or maritime ban in Ming China further spurred the migration of Chinese to Southeast Asia. Marooned Cantonese and Hokkien naval officers would set up small gangs for protection along river estuaries and recruit local silat practitioners as foot soldiers known as lang or lanun (Malay for pirate). Chinese pirates like Liang Daoming and Chen Zuyi became so successful that they managed to come into positions of leadership. Whether pirates or not, Southeast Asia's boat people were crucial to the accumulation of weapons and techniques in silat. Through their journeys they acquired weapons from across the region, came into contact with other fighting styles, and spread silat into Brunei.

Southeast Asian trade had already extended into Okinawa and Japan by the 15th century. The number of Japanese people travelling the region increased after the Battle of Sekigahara. By the early 17th century there were small Japanese communities living and trading in Indochina. Some arrived with the official red seal ships while others were warriors and pirates from the losing side of the Sekigahara war. Although mostly confined to Siam, some Japanese escaped to Cambodia and Indonesia after the Ayutthaya Kingdom was attacked by the Burmese. Silat shares many similarities with Okinawan karate as well as the throws and stances of weapon-based Japanese martial arts which probably date back to this time. Trade with Japan ended when the country went into self-imposed isolation but resumed during the Meiji era, during which time certain areas of Malaysia, Indonesia and Singapore became home to a small Japanese population. After the Japanese Occupation, some silat masters incorporated the katana into their systems.

As India came under the rule of conquerors from Central Asia and the Middle East, the Indian traders who frequented Southeast Asia introduced knives of Arabian origin to the western coast of the Indonesian Archipelago. Indian-Muslim blades brought a Moorish influence to the shape of a few local knives, most strongly seen in Aceh. These weapons, sometimes erroneously called "Muslim weaponry", spread into Sulawesi and West Malaysia by the 19th century. The only notable examples of such blades are the jambia and the karis, the latter being a short Acehnese hook-like knife (not to be confused with the indigenous kris).

Since the Islamisation movement of the 1980s and 90s, there have been attempts to make silat more compliant with modern Muslim beliefs and practices. Many instructors justify this by creating new histories to tie their style with Islam and distance themselves from traditional folklore. Some Malaysian silat schools go so far as refusing to teach non-Muslims, or to perform at non-Muslim weddings. This has given rise to various misconceptions that silat is inherently Muslim or can only be practised by followers of the Islamic faith. In actuality, the Hindu-Buddhist and animistic roots of the art were never eradicated, and remain very evident even among Muslim practitioners. As a result of this modern trend, many traditional practices and styles have become increasingly rare. It is now illegal for Muslim practitioners in Malaysia to chant mantra, or attempt to acquire supernatural powers. Traditional meditation is sometimes also discouraged or altered, and the incantations spoken before training or during massage are now often replaced with prayer recitation.

== Weapons ==
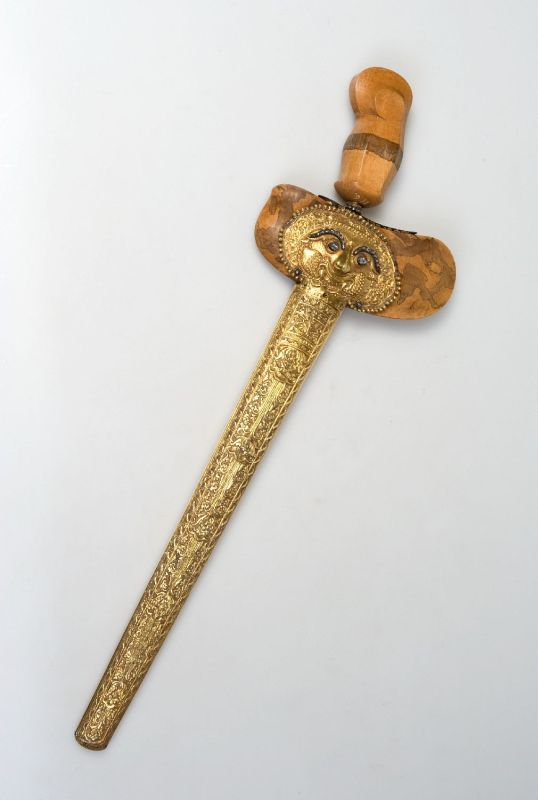
Balinese kris with golden sheath, surmounted by the face of a demon (raksasa) with diamond eyes

Prior to the introduction of firearms, weapons training was actually considered to be of greater value than unarmed techniques and even today many masters consider a student's training incomplete if they have not learned the use of weapons. Except for some weapon-based styles, students must generally achieve a certain degree of skill before being presented with a weapon which is traditionally made by the guru. This signifies the beginning of weapons-training. Silat uses the principle of applying the same techniques both armed and unarmed, though not quite to the same degree as is done in the Filipino martial arts. Unlike eskrima, silat does not necessarily emphasise armed combat and practitioners may choose to focus mainly on fighting empty-handed. Advanced students practice unarmed against armed opponents.

Among the hundreds of styles are dozens of weapons. The most commonly used are the staff, broadsword, and various types of knives. Silat today is often associated with the kris or dagger which was traditionally used mainly as a last resort when the fighter had no other weapon available or lost their main weapon in battle. As such, older styles place less importance on the weapon, particularly in Indonesia. However, its significance as a cultural symbol has raised the importance of the kris to such an extent that it has become the primary weapon of many later systems in the Malay Peninsula. Silat's traditional arsenal is largely made up of objects designed for domestic purposes such as the flute (seruling), rope (tali), sickle (sabit) and chain (rantai).

== Training ==
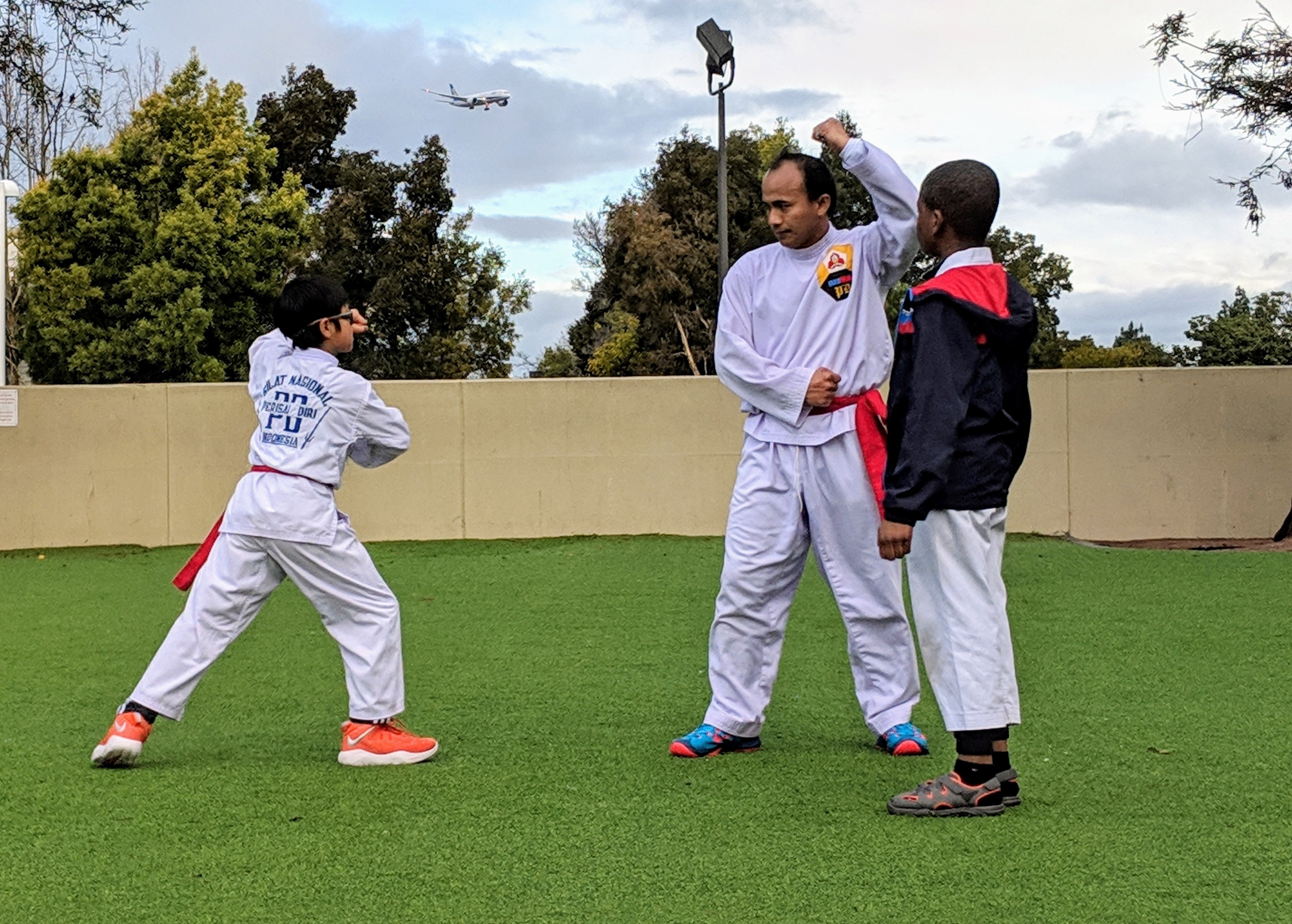
Silat training in Santa Clara, California.

=== Initiation ===
To signify the initiation of a new student, certain rituals may be carried out. This may include fasting for a few days, or drinking herbal tea. Silat masters traditionally never charged fees for their teaching, but money or some other gift may be offered by the aspiring student. Such practices usually don't apply today, especially outside Southeast Asia, but a few schools like Silat Lintar preserve their own initiation ritual.

=== Salutation ===
Silat practitioners begin and end each routine and practice session by saluting their teacher, partner or any spectators as a show of respect. The handsign used is dependent on style and lineage. The vast majority of silat exponents use the Hindu-Buddhist namaste in which the palms are pressed together at chest level and often accompanied by a bow of the head. This represents the balance of two opposing forces represented either by the harimau (tiger, male aspect) and buaya (crocodile, female aspect) or by the nāga (dragon) and garuda (giant eagle). This concept is referred to as jantan betina (male-female) and is equivalent to the androgynous Indian Ardhanarishvara or the Chinese yin and yang. The head or upper body is usually bowed as a sign of humility. This was used as a greeting in ancient times, as can still be seen throughout much of Indochina, and until recent decades it was also a form of apology among Malays. The practical purpose of the salute is to trigger the proper state of mind for training or fighting. Additionally, it serves as a technique in itself to block attacks aimed at the face.

Some traditional Javanese schools use another handsign in which the left hand clasps the right fist. In the context of silat, the fist symbolises martial skill while the opposite hand is a sign of courtesy and camaraderie. This is meant to convey mutual respect and shows that the fighters are willing to learn from each other. Like the namaste it recalls the idea of duality. A few systems, such as silat Pattani, may have their own form of salutation unique to that particular system.

=== Stances and footwork ===
Every style of silat incorporates multi-level fighting stances (sikap pasang), or preset postures meant to provide the foundation for remaining stable while in motion. The horse stance (kekuda) is the most essential posture, common to many Asian martial arts. Beginners once had to practice this stance for long periods of time, sometimes as many as four hours, but today's practitioners train until it can be easily held for at least ten minutes. Stances are taught in tandem with langkah (lit. 'step'), a set of structured steps. Langkah consist of basic footwork and kicks made to teach how best to move in a fight. The langkah kuching (cat step) and langkah lawan (warrior step) are among the more prominent examples of langkah. After becoming proficient at langkah, students learn footwork patterns or tapak ("sole") from which to apply fighting techniques. Each tapak takes account of not only the particular move being used but also the potential for change in each movement and action. Among the most common formations are tapak tiga, tapak empat and tapak lima. All together, the stances, langkah, and tapak act as a basis for forms-training.

=== Forms ===
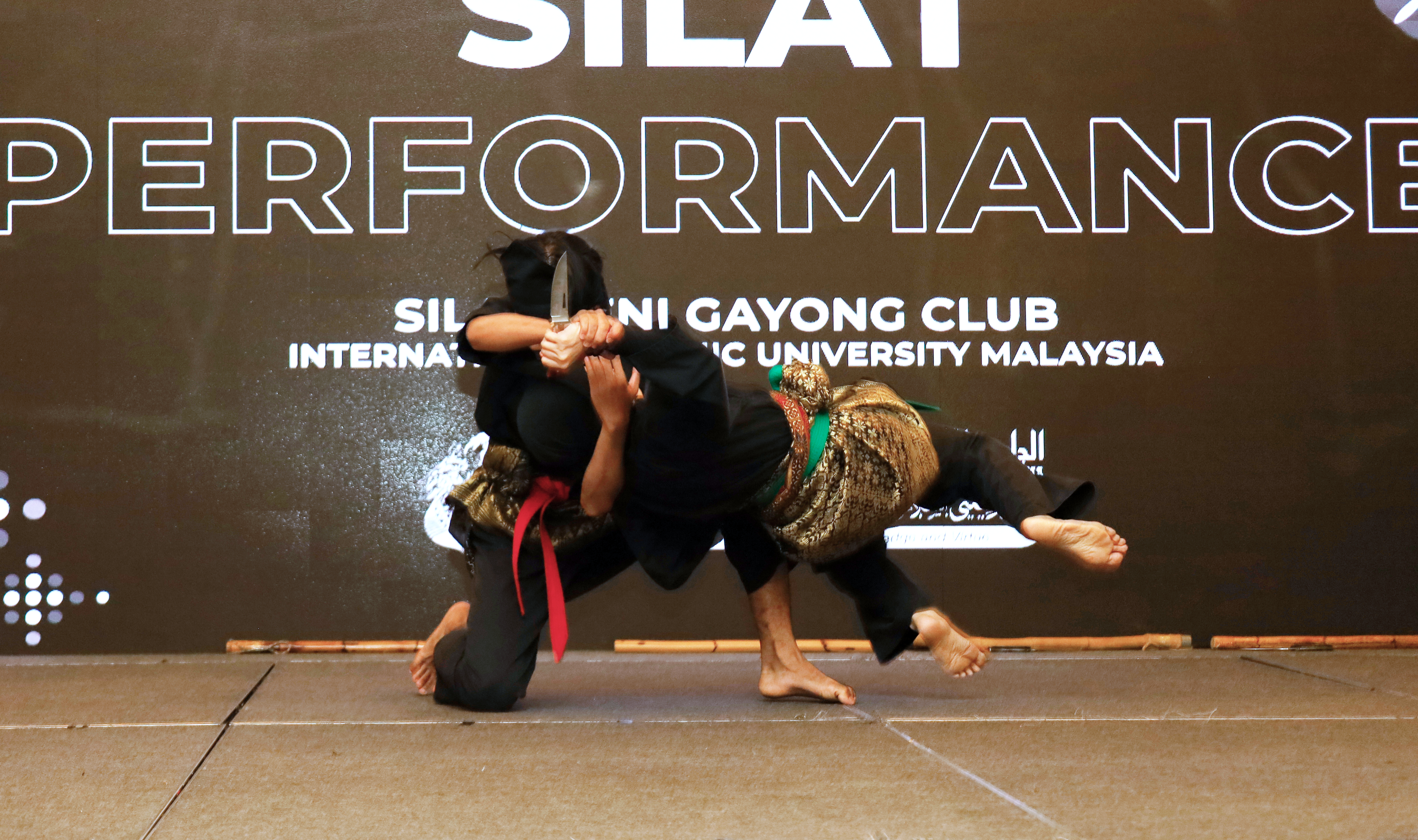
During performances, practitioners would usually perform a full set of jurus to emulate a full combat scenario.

Forms or jurus are a series of prearranged meta-movements practised as a single set. Their main function is to pass down all of a style's techniques and combat applications in an organised manner, as well as being a method of physical conditioning and public demonstration. While demonstrating a form, silat practitioners often use the open hand to slap parts of their own body such the shoulder, elbow, thigh or knee. This reminds the pesilat that when an opponent comes close there may be an opportunity to trap their attacking limbs. Aside from solo forms, they may also be performed with one or more partners. Routines pitting one fighter against several opponents are common in silat. Partnered forms are useful for teaching the application of techniques, particularly those attacks which are too dangerous to be used in a sparring match.

Tari ("dance") are freestyle forms which haven't been arranged beforehand but are created spontaneously. With a partner, tari is used as a way of sensitivity training similar to Chinese chi sao. The aesthetic aspect of forms is called flower (kembangan or bunga) or art (seni) forms. They are performed in slow, graceful movements with a dance-like quality.

=== Sparring ===
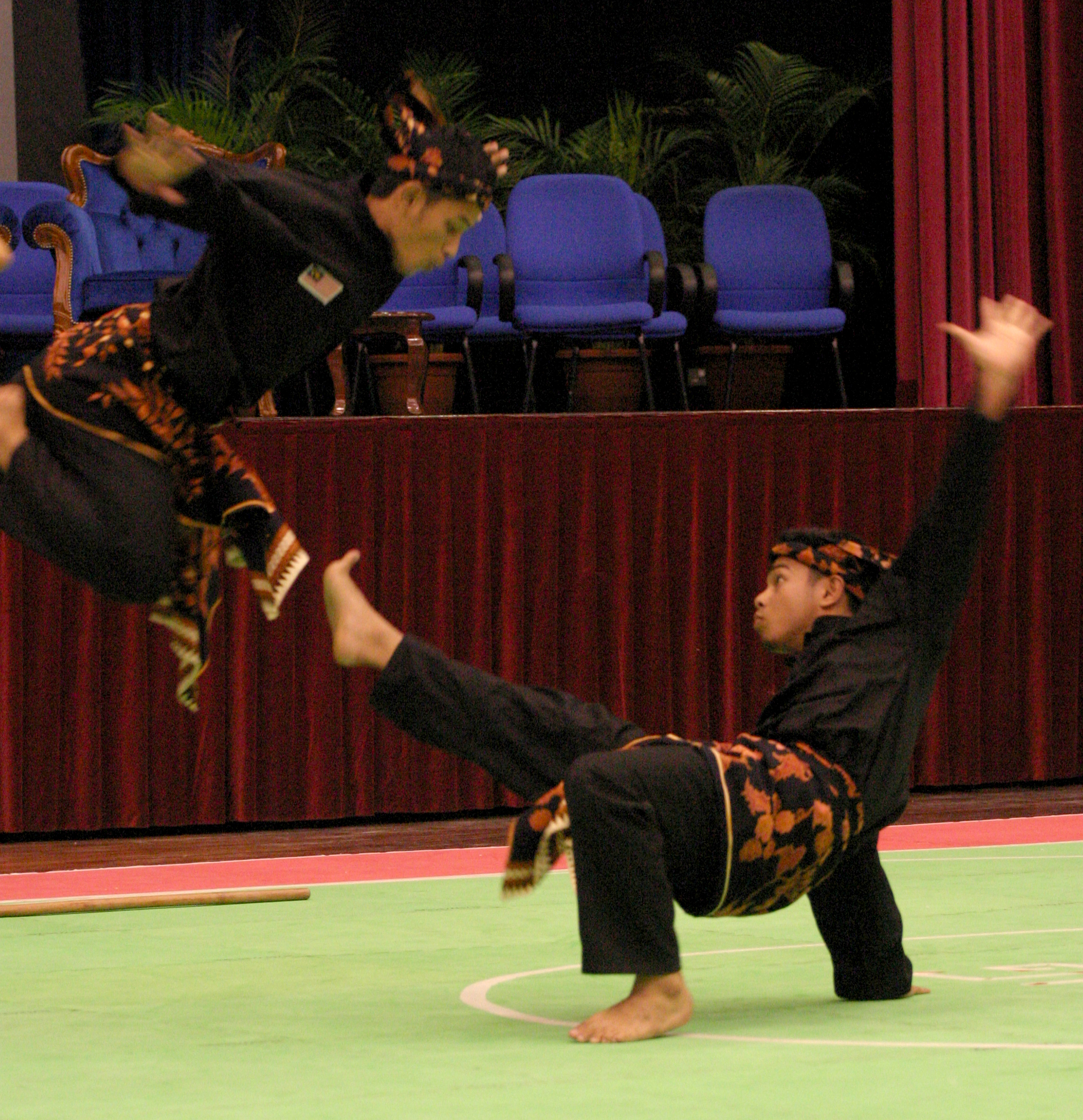

Sparring in silat may be done according to official competitive rules with protective gear, or traditionally with no protection at all. In either case, attacks to vital areas are prohibited. Sparring, as with silat training in general, was often done in varying conditions to prepare the fighter for combat in any situation. The most common of these was training in dim light, sparring against several opponents, fighting unarmed against a weaponed opponent, and fighting in darkness or blindfolded. Others include fighting in a tight space (common in Bajau styles), on a slippery surface (as in Minang styles), or from a seated position (a fundamental of Sunda styles). Experienced practitioners may fight against up to twelve opponents, a practice known as kerojok in Javanese. The defender is attacked by both armed and unarmed opponents. Weapons can be interchanged between the attackers, while the defender is allowed to steal and use the weapons against them. These matches were traditionally full-contact and highly dangerous, but are generally kept light-contact today.

=== Competition ===
While sparring may vary according to style and school, official matches follow the rules outlined by IPSI. These are:

1. Strikes are only legal if they hit between the shoulder line and the waist. Each successful strike is awarded one point.
2. Hitting the face or below the belt is a penalty.
3. Throws in themselves are not awarded points, and ground follow-up is permitted.
4. A joint-lock is awarded 10 points.
5. Immobilising the opponent by holding them helpless is worth 5 points.

=== Energy ===
In silat culture, the energetic body consists of interlocking circles called cakera. The cakera's energy rotates outwards along diagonal lines. Energy that emits outwards from the centre line is defensive while offensive energy moves inwards from the sides of the body. By being aware of this the silat practitioner can harmonise their movements with the cakera, thereby increasing the power and effectiveness of attacks and movements. Energy could also be used for healing or focused into a single point when applied to sentuhan, the art of attacking an opponent's pressure points. Folklore describes legendary techniques that allow the fighter to attack from afar using energy alone without physically touching the opponent.

=== Terms of address ===
In Indonesia, anyone who teaches silat is addressed as Guru or teacher. In Malaysia, instructors who are qualified to teach but haven't yet achieved full mastery are addressed as Cikgu. Masters are called Guru while grandmasters are called Mahaguru meaning supreme teacher. The terms cikgu and guru are often interchangeable. An elderly male master may be addressed as Tok Guru or Tuk Guru (lit. 'teacher-grandfather'), often abbreviated to Tok meaning grandfather. The Javanese equivalent of this term is Eyang Guru which may be used for an elderly master or the teacher's master. In all countries where silat is practised, the honorary title of Pendekar may be officially bestowed onto a master by royalty or unofficially by commoners.

== Music ==
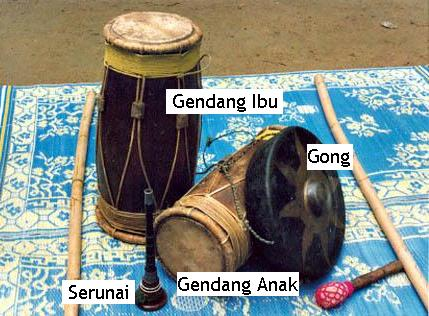
Basic drum set

Music is used in silat to determine the rhythm of a trainee's movements. This training aspect, often simplistically seen as "performance", is what is known as pencak. These movements are often displayed during festivities such as weddings or a royal installation. They can be done either solo or with a partner and are accompanied by music played by a live band. Several traditional dances were influenced by silat, such as the inai from northern Malaysia. In the Minangkabau area silat is one of the main components in the men's folk dance called randai, besides bakaba (storytelling) and saluang jo dendang (song-and-flute).

The music played during silat performances is known as gendang baku in the Malay Peninsula, and gendang pencha among the Sunda people of West Java. The traditional tunes are often influenced by Nepalese music. The instruments vary from one region to another but the gamelan (Javanese orchestra), kendang or gendang (drum), suling (flute) and gong are common throughout Southeast Asia. Drums are the main and sometimes only instrument in Minang silat of West Sumatra. The most common instruments in Malaysia are the gendang (drums) and serunai (oboe). Music from the northern part of the Malay Peninsula more closely resembles Thai music.

Types of silat drums include the gendang ibu or "mother drum" and the gendang anak or "child drum". The serunai, which also comes in long and short variations, is what gives silat music its distinct sound.

== In popular culture ==
=== Film ===
Silat's appearance in film dates back to black-and-white Indonesian and Malay movies. Shaw Brothers and Cathay-Kris Studio produced more than 40 popular titles featuring silat in Malaysia during the 1950s and 1960s. Famous examples from this period include Tiger from Tjampa (1953), Panglima Besi, Seri Mersing, Musang Berjanggut, Hang Jebat, Serikandi, and Malaysia's first colour movie, Hang Tuah. While silat was featured in all these films for the purpose of the plot, the depiction of the art was not a priority. What was shown was essentially silat wayang, designed for stage performances. There was very little choreography arranged beforehand and they were never promoted as either action or martial art movies. Accordingly, actors at the time usually had no prior training in silat, resulting in what are now considered generally poor depictions of the art. However, silat became increasingly prominent in Indonesian movies during the 70s, resulting in more professional and authentic depictions of the art in both historical films as well as action movies. Indonesian action stars Ratno Timoer and Advent Bangun were famous for 80s silat films such as The Devil's Sword and Malaikat Bayangan. In Malaysia on the other hand, silat became increasingly rare on-screen during the subsequent decades. After the year 2000, silat was featured to varying degrees of importance in popular Malay movies such as Jiwa Taiko, Gong, KL Gangster, Pontianak Harum Sundal Malam, and the colour remake of Orang Minyak. Other notable instances of authentic silat in film include the following:

- Puteri Gunung Ledang, Malaysia's first big-budget movie, featured two highly publicised fights choreographed by a silat exponent. Upon the film's release these scenes were not well-received, with reviewers criticising the battles as badly-choreographed, too short, and generally over-hyped.
- Queens of Langkasuka is the first Thai film to prominently feature silat. Among the few other Thai movies to do so is 2008's Ong-Bak 2 which only briefly features a style of tiger silat.
- The 2009 Indonesian film Merantau showcased Silek Harimau, one of the oldest silat systems in existence. The film had a positive reaction from cinema critics and is credited with reviving Indonesia's martial arts in film. The movie generated enough interest for the film's director and lead actor to follow up with The Raid: Redemption in 2011 which received international acclaim. Its sequel The Raid 2: Berandal was similarly well-received but drew criticism for its graphic violence, and was banned from a theatrical release in Malaysia.
- The 2014 Indonesian movie The Golden Cane Warrior has helped revive interest in the historical silat genre (cerita silat) which has been dormant in film for years.
- The 2014 Brunei movie Yasmine is about a teenage female protagonist who learns silat.
- The 2016 American film The Accountant features the main character being trained in and using silat.
- The 2018 Indonesian movie Wiro Sableng 212 also revived the historical silat genre, adapted from popular silat novel series in Indonesia titled Wiro Sableng. Set on the 16th century island of Java, it tells the story of Wiro Sableng, a young pendekar who receives a task from his teacher Sinto Gendeng, a mysterious old female warrior, to arrest Mahesa Birawa, an evil villain which is also her former student.

=== Television ===
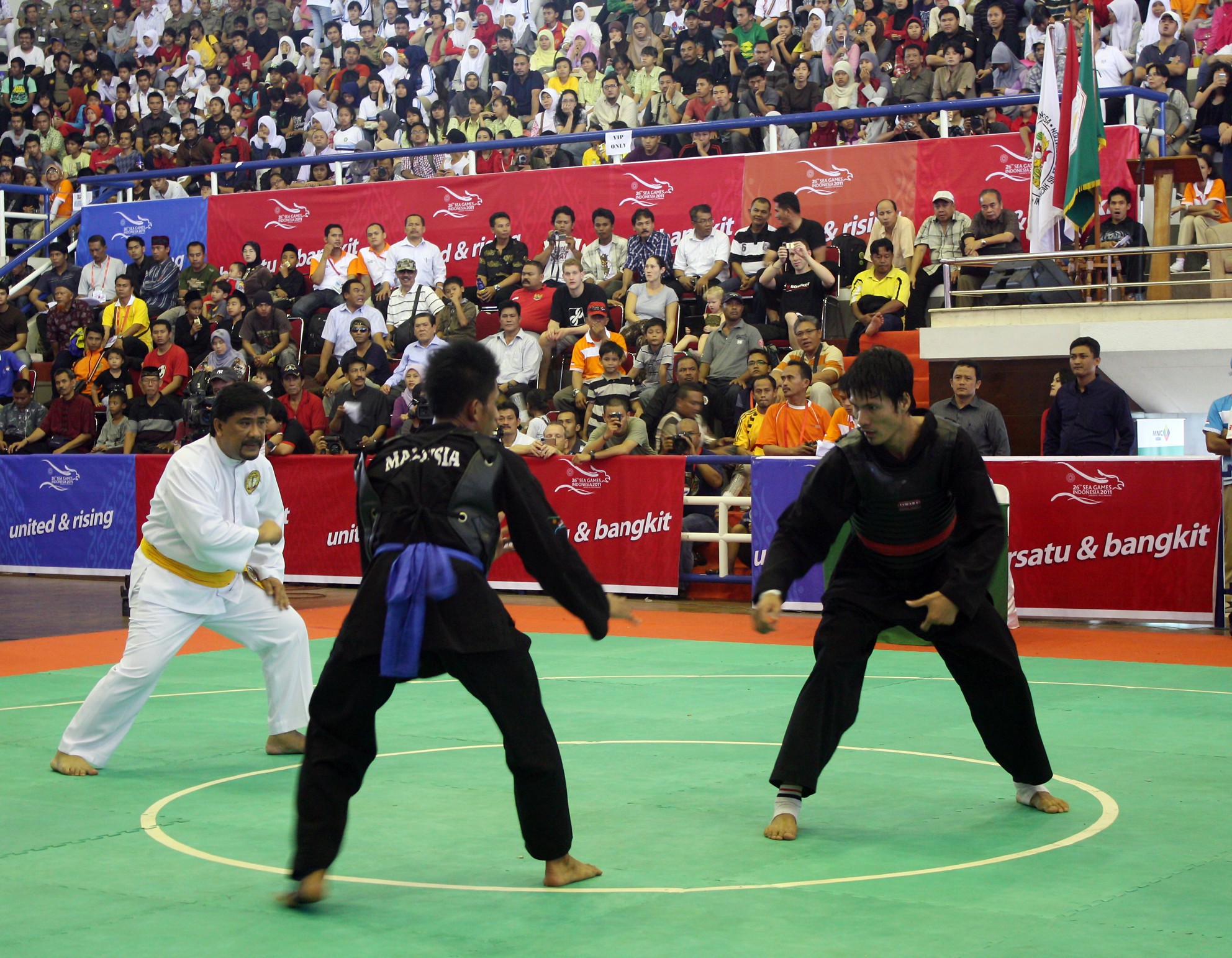
Pencak Silat finals at the SEA Games XXVI

Period dramas which feature silat have been a common staple of Indonesian television for many decades, typically supplemented by wire-work and/or CG effects. In Malaysia, this genre is said to have reached its peak during the 1990s when directors like Uwei Shaari strove to depict silat in its original form by casting martial artists rather than famous actors. Series from that period such as Keris Lok Tujuh, Pendekar: Bayangan Harta and Keris Hitam Bersepuh Emas are still regarded as the country's best costume dramas before the genre began to decline in Malaysia after the early 2000s. Aside from period dramas, authentic silat is often featured in other genres, such as the Indonesian series Mawar Merah and the made-for-TV children's movie Borobudur. In Malaysia, various styles of silat are regularly showcased in martial arts-themed documentary serials like Mahaguru, Gelanggang and Gerak Tangkas. Other instances of silat on television include the following.

- An episode of Discovery Channel's series Fight Quest showcased pencak silat in Bandung, Indonesia.

=== Literature ===
Silat in the literary tradition can be traced back to the old hikayat or epics which became popular as literacy spread among Southeast Asian commoners, specifically commoners from the Malay Peninsula beginning around the 13th century. Stories such as Hikayat Inderajaya and Hikayat Hang Tuah from Malaysia, focus on legendary or semi-historical martial artists. In Indonesia, this tradition has continued into modern times in the form of historical silat novels or cerita silat, equivalent to the Chinese wuxia genre. Notable authors include Bastian Tito, Kho Ping Ho and S.H. Mintardja whose popular books have been adapted into period-dramas for television such as Wira Sableng and Naga Sasra Sabuk Intan. While this genre is nearly unknown in Malaysia, silat does sometimes feature in Malay novels and anthologies set during the Malacca Sultanate era. Outside Asia, silat was referenced in Tom Clancy's Net Force by Steve Perry, although the books give a fictionalized portrayal of the art. Sumito, a fictional martial art in Perry's own Matador series, is based on silat.

=== Comics ===
The earliest instance of silat in graphic novels are found in Indonesian comics of the 1960s which typically featured heroes that were expert martial artists. The titles Si Buta Dari Gua Hantu, Jaka Sembung, Panji Tengkorak and Walet Merah all gave rise to popular films in the 1970s and 80s. Indonesian action star Barry Prima made a name for himself portraying the character of Jaka Sembung onscreen. Silat is featured in Malaysian comics as well but none have become well-known, due partly to the genre not being popular among Malaysians. Outside Southeast Asia, silat has been featured in the Japanese manga titles Kenichi: The Mightiest Disciple and Kengan Omega.

=== Radio ===
The most well-known Indonesian radio shows began in the 1980s, all of them historical dramas concerning the adventures of martial artists in Hindu-Buddhist kingdoms of medieval Java and Sumatra. The most famous of these were Saur Sepuh, and Tutur Tinular and its sequel Mahkota Mayangkara. Each programme was highly successful in its home country, and continues to spawn films and television series.

=== Aviation ===
Singapore Airlines' 2025-published safety video features a Silat performance at Tanjong Beach, Sentosa, emphasising on the brace position.

== See also ==
- Kuntao
- Pencak Silat
- Silambam
- Silat Harimau
- Silat Melayu
- Styles of silat
- Weapons of silat
