= Islamic culture =

Cultural practices common among various peoples of the Muslim world

Islamic cultures or Muslim cultures refers to the historic cultural practices that developed among the various peoples living in the Muslim world. These practices, while not always religious in nature, are generally influenced by aspects of Islam, particularly due to the religion serving as an effective conduit for the inter-mingling of people from different ethnic/national backgrounds in a way that enabled their cultures to come together on the basis of a common Muslim identity. The earliest forms of Muslim culture, from the Rashidun Caliphate to the Umayyad Caliphate and early Abbasid Caliphate, was predominantly based on the existing cultural practices of the Arabs, the Byzantines, and the Persians. However, as the Islamic empires expanded rapidly, Muslim culture was further influenced and assimilated much from the Iranic, Pakistani, Bangladeshi, Indian, Caucasian, Turkic, Malay, Somali, Berber, and Indonesian cultures.

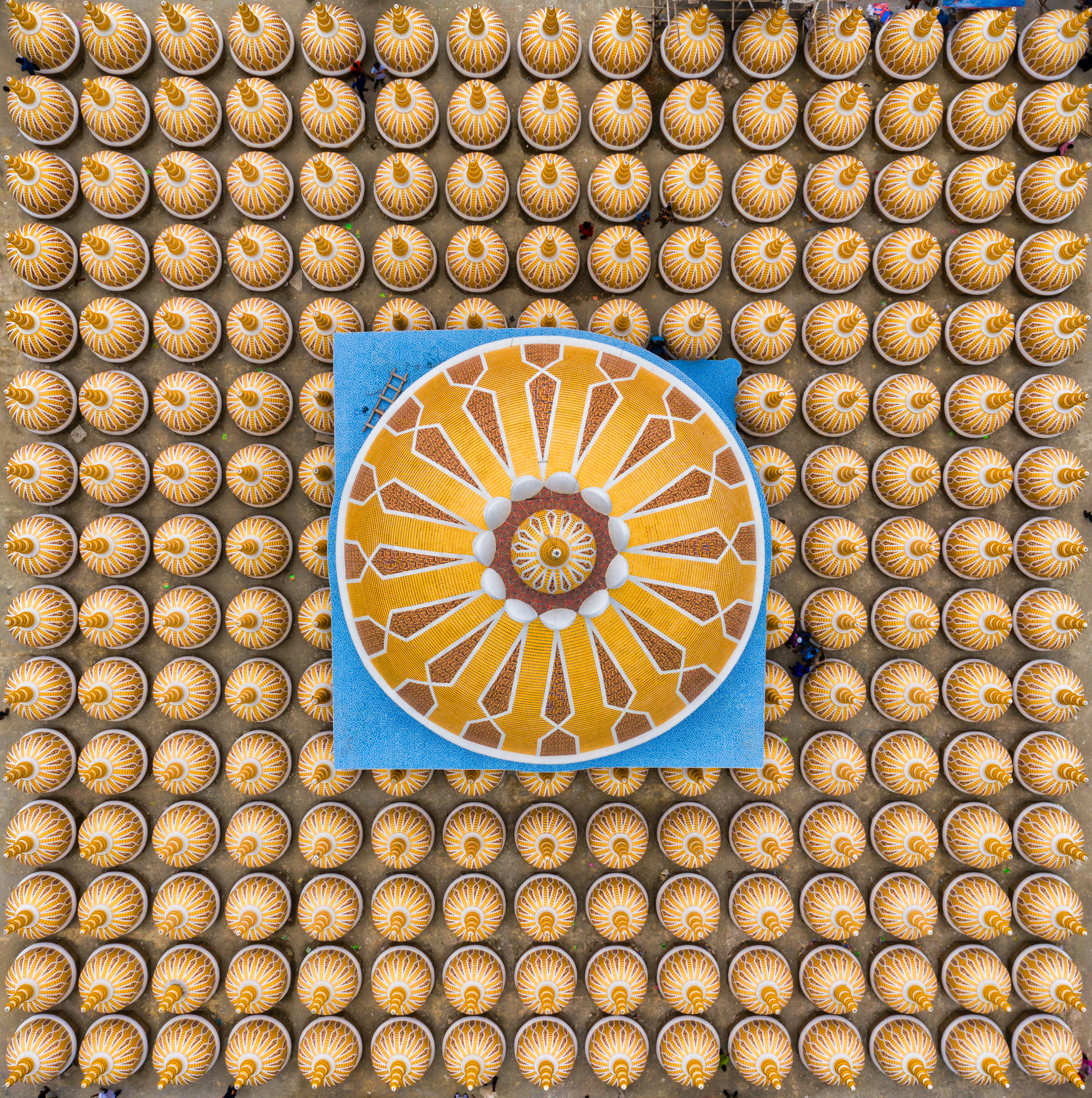
201 Dome Mosque, Tangail, Bangladesh

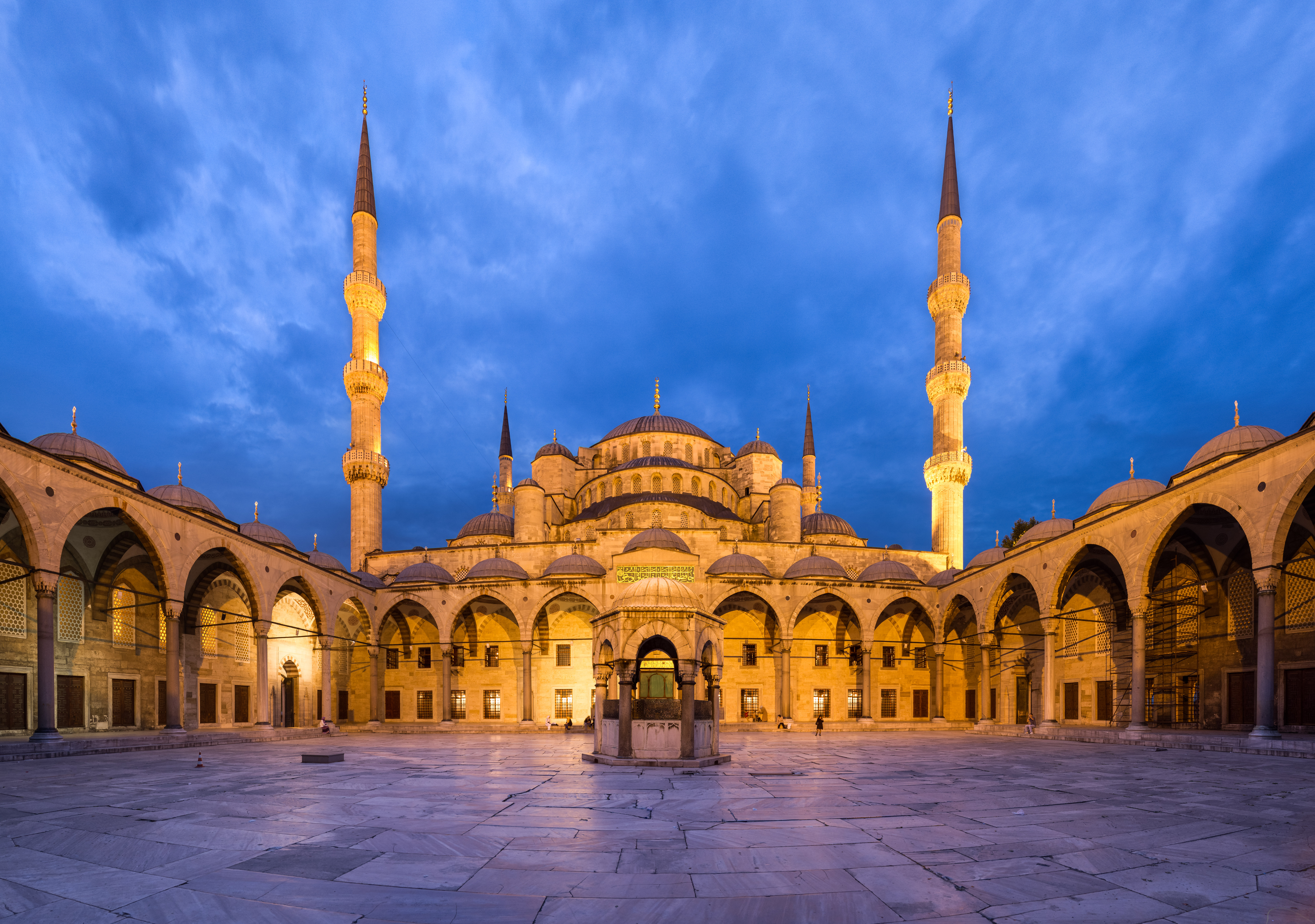
Sultan Ahmed Mosque, Istanbul, Turkey

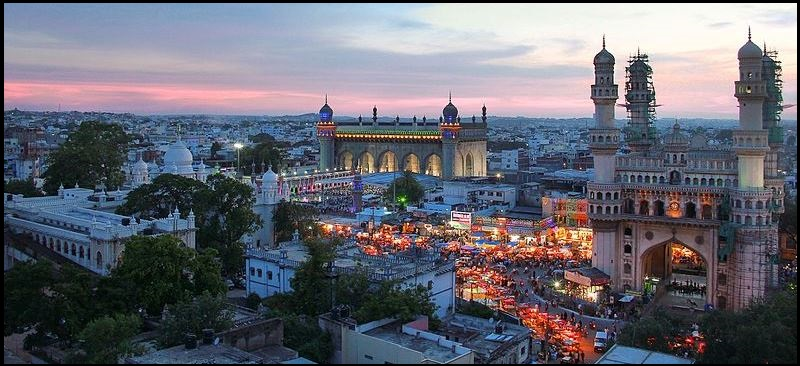
Hyderabad, India during Ramadan

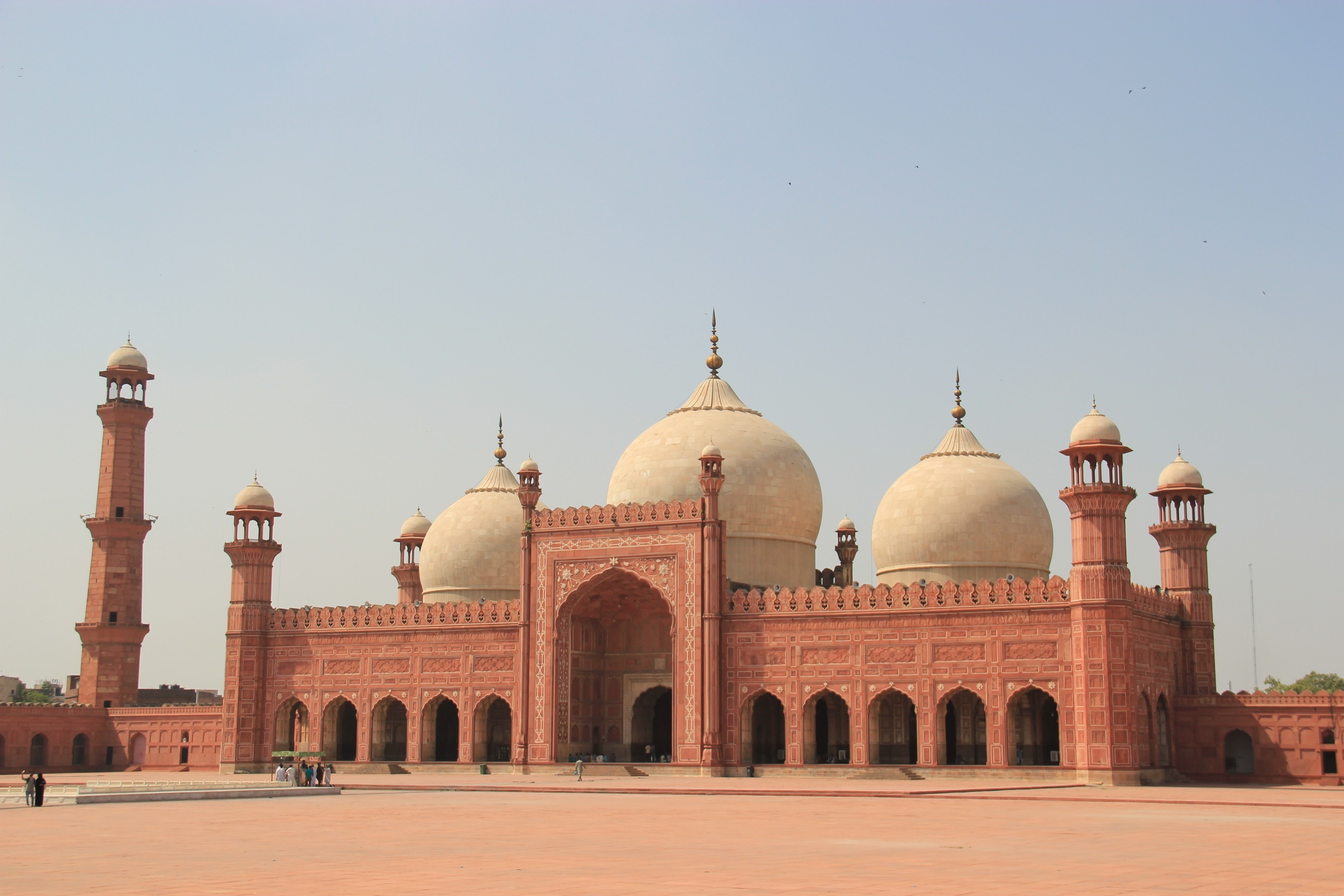
Badshahi Masjid in Lahore, Pakistan

Owing to a variety of factors, there are variations in the application of Islamic beliefs in different cultures and traditions.

== Language and literature ==
=== Arabic ===
Arabic literature (Arabic: الأدب العربي / ALA-LC: al-Adab al-'Arabī) is the writing, both prose and poetry, produced by writers in the Arabic language. The Arabic word used for literature is Adab, which is derived from a meaning of etiquette, and which implies politeness, culture and enrichment.

Arabic literature emerged in the 5th century with only fragments of the written language appearing before then. The Quran, (the holy book of Islam) widely regarded by people as the finest piece of literature in the Arabic language, would have the greatest lasting effect on Arabic culture and its literature. Arabic literature flourished during the Islamic Golden Age, but has remained vibrant to the present day, with poets and prose-writers across the Arab world, as well as rest of the world, achieving increasing success.

=== Persian/Iranic ===
Persian literature comprises oral compositions and written texts in Western Iranian languages, particularly Middle and New Persian, and it is one of the world's oldest literatures. It spans over two-and-a-half millennia. Its sources have been within Greater Iran including present-day Iran, Iraq, Syria, Afghanistan, the Caucasus, and Turkey, regions of Central Asia such as Tajikistan, and South Asia, where Persian has historically been either the native or official language. For instance, Rumi, one of the best-loved Persian poets, was born in Balkh (in what is now Afghanistan) or Vakhsh (in what is now Tajikistan), wrote in Persian, and lived in Konya, then the capital of the Seljuks in Anatolia. The Ghaznavids conquered large territories in Central and South Asia and adopted Persian as their court language. There is thus Persian literature from Iran, Mesopotamia, Azerbaijan, the wider Transcaucasus, Anatolia, western parts of Pakistan, Bangladesh, India, Tajikistan and other parts of Central Asia.

Not all Persian literature is written in Persian; works written by ethnic Persians in other languages, such as Greek and Arabic, are sometimes included. At the same time, not all literature written in Persian is written by ethnic Persians or Iranians; Turkic, Caucasian, and Indian poets and writers have also used the Persian language in the environment of Persianate societies.

Described as one of the great literatures of humanity, including Goethe's assessment of it as one of the four main bodies of world literature, Persian literature has its roots in surviving works of Middle and Old Persian, the latter of which date back as far as 522 BCE, the date of the earliest surviving Achaemenid inscription, the Behistun Inscription. The bulk of surviving Persian literature, however, comes from the times following the Muslim conquest of Persia c. 650. After the Abbasid Caliphate came to power in 750, Persians became its scribes and bureaucrats and, increasingly, also its writers and poets. The New Persian language literature arose and flourished in Khorasan and Transoxiana because of political reasons, early Iranian dynasties such as the Tahirids and Samanids being based in Khorasan.

Persian poets such as Ferdowsi, Saadi Shirazi, Hafiz Shirazi, Attar of Nishapur, Nizami Ganjavi, Rumi and Omar Khayyam are also known in the West and have influenced the literature of many countries.

=== Indic ===
For a thousand years, since the invasion of India by the Ghaznavids, the Persian–Islamic culture of the eastern half of the Islamic world started to influence the Indian culture. Persian was the official language of most Indian empires such as the Ghaznavids, the Delhi Sultanate, the Bengal Sultanate, the Deccan Sultanates (such as the Qutb Shahi dynasty) and the Mughal Empire. Persian artistic forms in literature and poetry such as ghazals have come to significantly affect Urdu and other Indian literature. More Persian literature was produced in India than in the Iranian world. As late as the 20th century, Allama Iqbal chose Persian for some of his major poetic works. The first Persian language newspaper was also published in India, given that printing machines were first implemented in India.

In Bengal, Muslim writers were exploring different themes through Islamic narratives and epics such as culture, cosmology, love and history. Starting from Shah Muhammad Saghir in the 14th century, Muslim writers began to enrich the Bengali language for over 600 years, often being actively supported and promoted by the rulers themselves. The early 20th century brought a new era for Bengali Islamic literature, with its most notable poet Kazi Nazrul Islam espousing intense rebellion against colonialism and oppression, in addition to writing a highly acclaimed collection of Bengali ghazals. Sultana's Dream by Begum Rokeya, an Islamic feminist, is one earliest works of feminist science fiction. UNESCO decided to observe 21 February as International Mother Language Day. The UNESCO General Conference took the decision that took effect on 17 November 1999,

=== Turkic ===
From the 11th century, there was a growing body of Islamic literature in the Turkic languages. However, for centuries to come the official language in Turkish-speaking areas would remain Persian. In Anatolia, with the advent of the Seljuks, the practise and usage of Persian in the region would be strongly revived. A branch of the Seljuks, the Sultanate of Rum, took Persian language, art and letters to Anatolia. They adopted Persian language as the official language of the empire. The Ottomans, which can "roughly" be seen as their eventual successors, took this tradition over. Persian was the official court language of the empire, and for some time, the official language of the empire, though the lingua franca amongst common people from the 15th/16th century would become Turkish as well as having laid an active "foundation" for the Turkic language as early as the 4th century (see Turkification). After a period of several centuries, Ottoman Turkish had developed towards a fully accepted language of literature, which was even able to satisfy the demands of a scientific presentation. However, the number of Persian and Arabic loanwords contained in those works increased at times up to 88%. However, Turkish was proclaimed the official language of the Karamanids in the 17th century, though it did not manage to become the official language in a wider area or larger empire until the advent of the Ottomans. With the establishment of the Ottoman Empire, Ottoman Turkish grew in importance in both poetry and prose becoming, by the beginning of the 18th century, the official language of the Empire. Unlike India, where Persian remained the official and principal literary language of both Muslim and Hindu states until the 19th century.

== Art ==
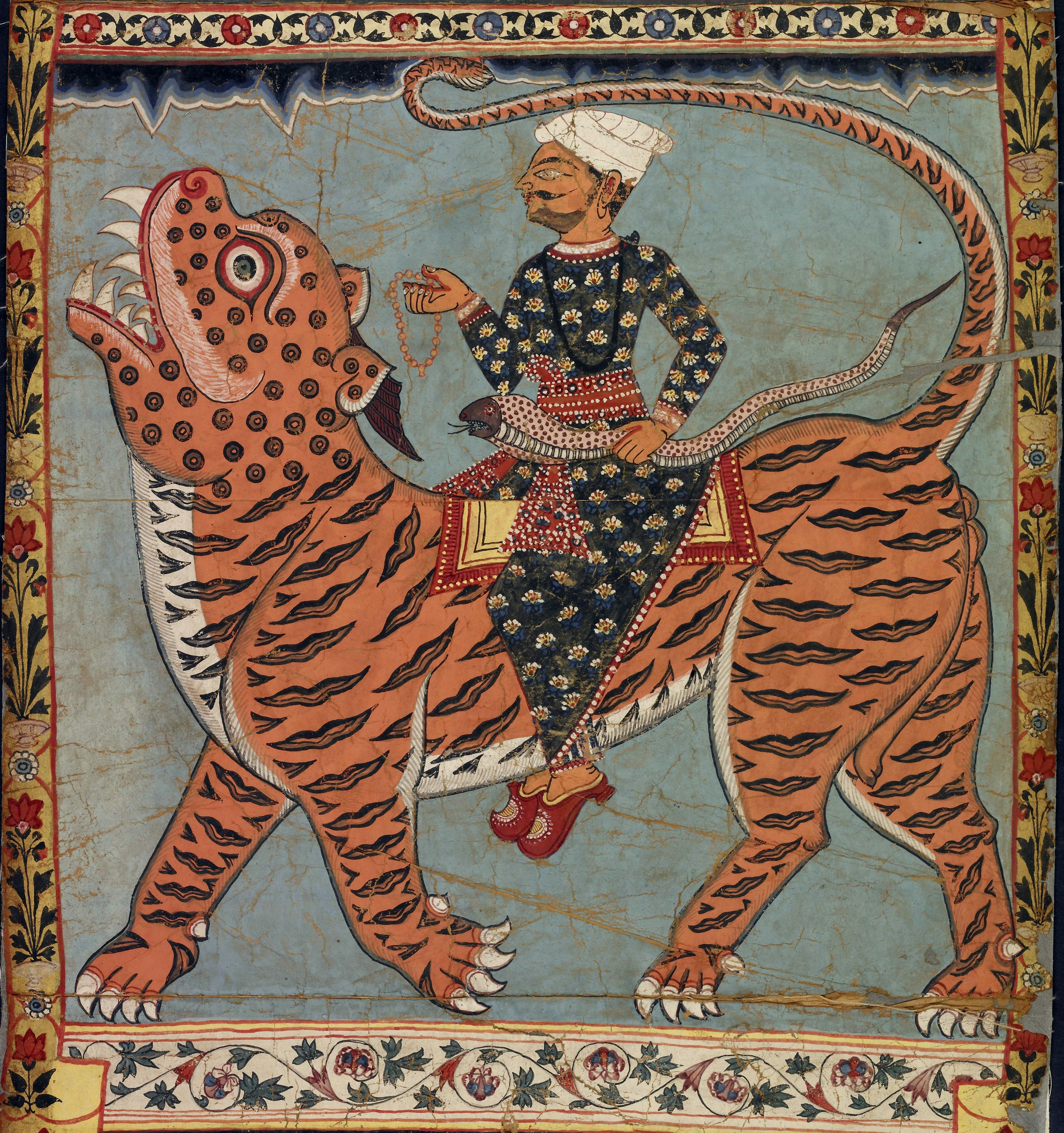
Patachitra of Gazi Pir, Sunderbans, Bangladesh

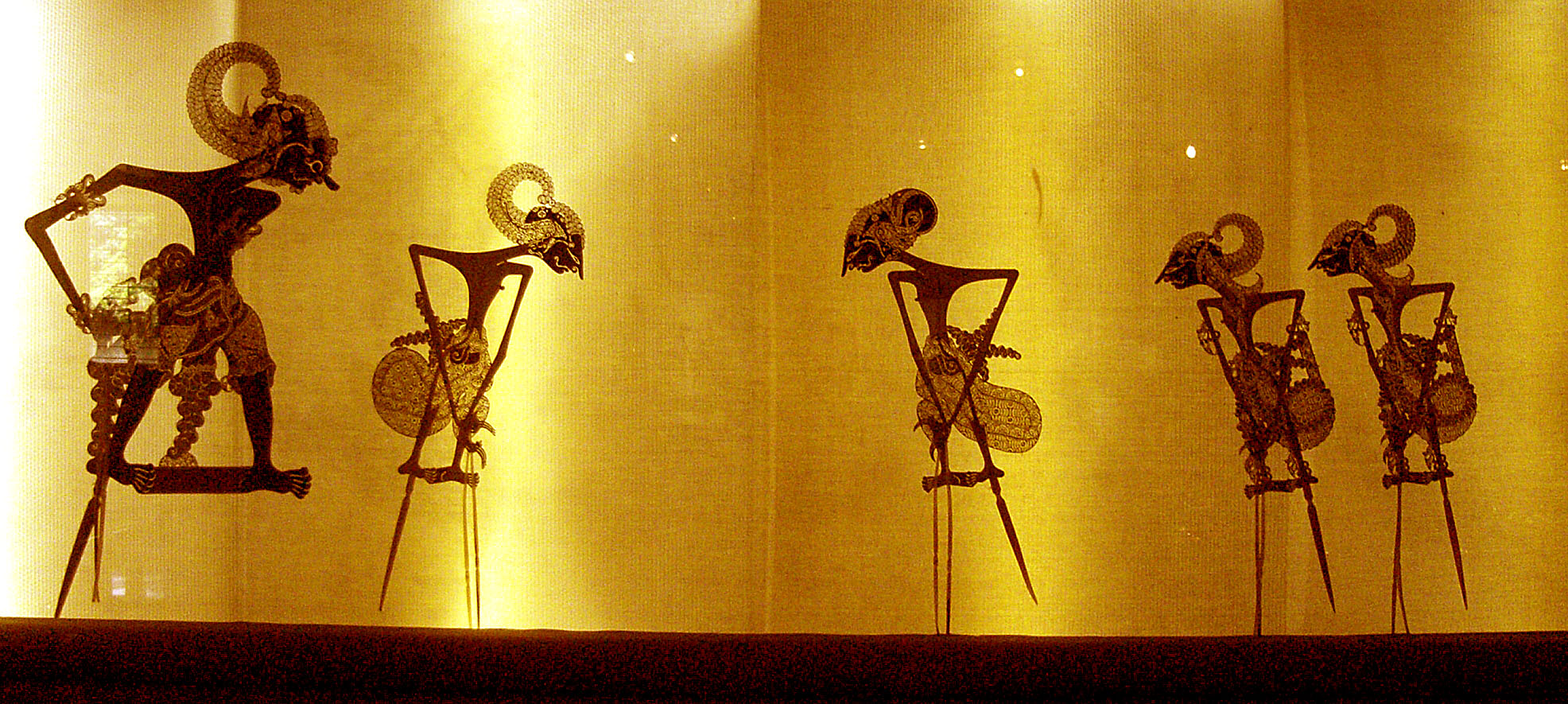
"Wayang Kulit", the Indonesian art of shadow puppetry, reflects a melding of indigenous and Islamic sensibilities.

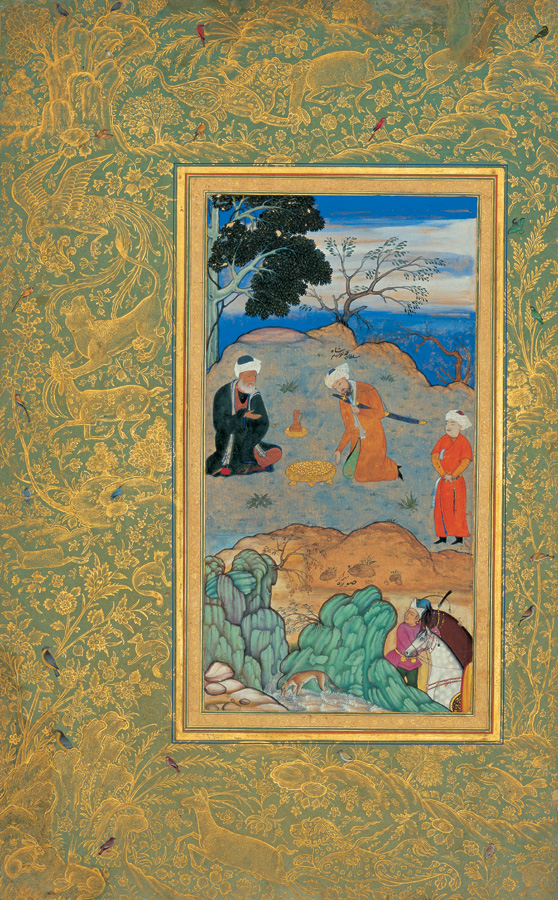
"Advice of the Ascetic", a 16th-century Persian miniature

Public Islamic art is traditionally non-representational, except for the widespread use of plant forms, usually in varieties of the spiralling arabesque. These are often combined with Islamic calligraphy, geometric patterns in styles that are typically found in a wide variety of media, from small objects in ceramic or metalwork to large decorative schemes in tiling on the outside and inside of large buildings, including mosques. However, there is a long tradition in Islamic art of the depiction of human and animal figures, especially in painting and small anonymous relief figures as part of a decorative scheme. Almost all Persian miniatures (as opposed to decorative illuminations) include figures, often in large numbers, as do their equivalents in Arab, Mughal and Ottoman miniatures. But miniatures in books or muraqqa albums were private works owned by the elite. Larger figures in monumental sculpture are exceptionally rare until recent times, and portraiture showing realistic representations of individuals (and animals) did not develop until the late 16th century in miniature painting, especially Mughal miniatures. Manuscripts of the Qur'an and other sacred texts have always been strictly kept free of such figures, but there is a long tradition of the depiction of Muhammad and other religious figures in books of history and poetry; since the 20th century Muhammad has mostly been shown as though wearing a veil hiding his face, and many earlier miniatures were overpainted to use this convention.

=== Depiction of animate beings ===
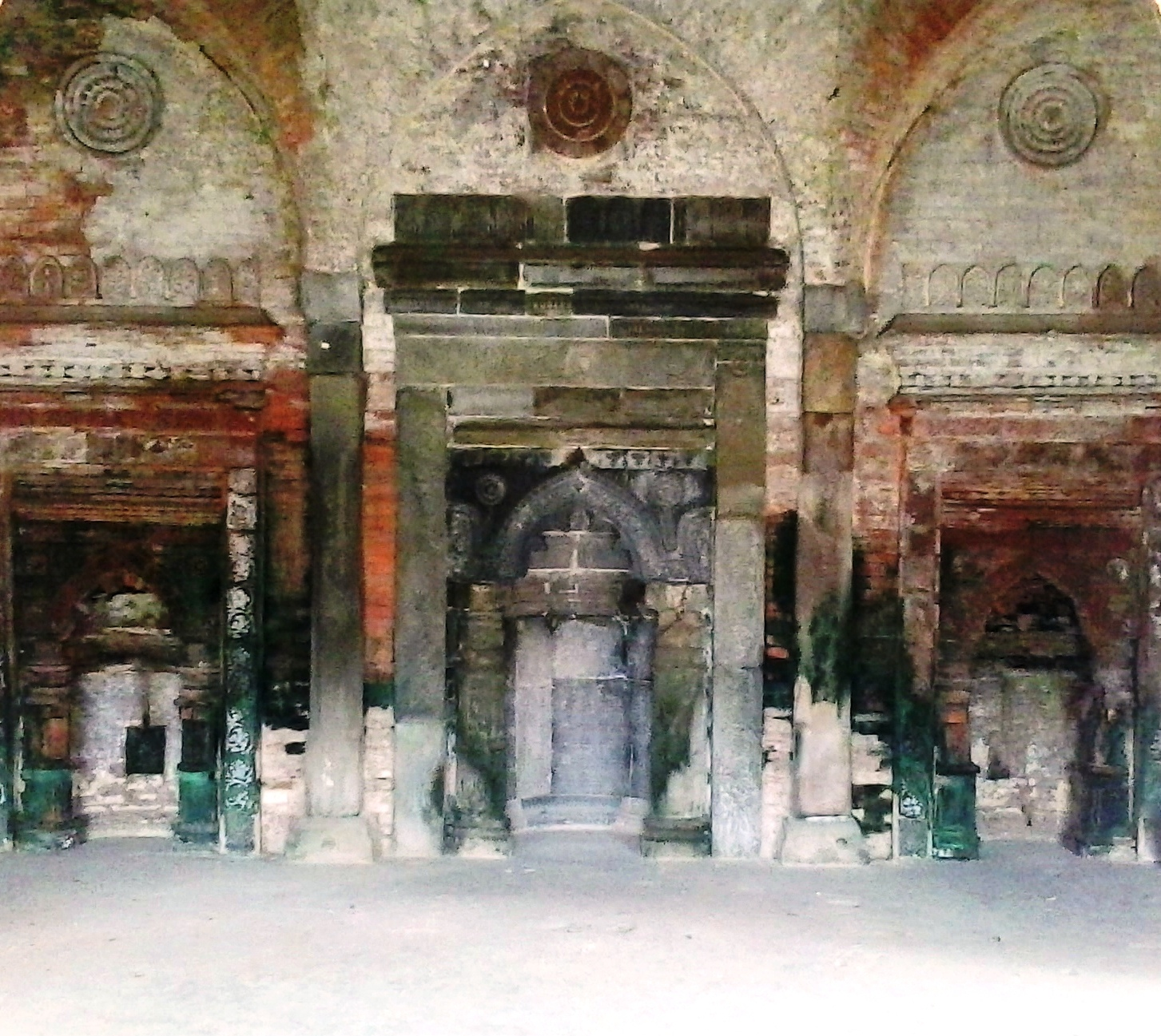
Bengali Mihrabs inside Goaldi Mosque

Some interpretations of Islam include a ban of depiction of animate beings, also known as aniconism. Islamic aniconism stems in part from the prohibition of idolatry and in part from the belief that creation of living forms is God's prerogative. Although the Quran does not explicitly prohibit visual representation of any living being, it uses the word musawwir (maker of forms, artist) as an epithet of God. The corpus of hadith (sayings attributed to the Islamic prophet Muhammad) contains more explicit prohibitions of images of living beings, challenging painters to "breathe life" into their images and threatening them with punishment on the Day of Judgment. Muslims have interpreted these prohibitions in different ways in different times and places. Religious Islamic art has been typically characterized by the absence of figures and extensive use of calligraphic, geometric and abstract floral patterns. However, representations of Muhammad (in some cases, with his face concealed) and other religious figures are found in some manuscripts from lands to the east of Anatolia, such as Persia and India. These pictures were meant to illustrate the story and not to infringe on the Islamic prohibition of idolatry, but many Muslims regard such images as forbidden. In secular art of the Muslim world, representations of human and animal forms historically flourished in nearly all Islamic cultures, although, partly because of opposing religious sentiments, figures in paintings were often stylized, giving rise to a variety of decorative figural designs.

=== Calligraphy ===
Islamic calligraphy is the artistic practice of handwriting and calligraphy, based upon the alphabet in the lands sharing a common Islamic cultural heritage. It includes Arabic Calligraphy, Ottoman, and Persian calligraphy. It is known in Arabic as khatt Islami (خط اسلامي), meaning Islamic line, design, or construction.

The development of Islamic calligraphy is strongly tied to the Qur'an; chapters and excerpts from the Qur'an are a common and almost universal text upon which Islamic calligraphy is based. However, Islamic calligraphy is not limited to strictly religious subjects, objects, or spaces. Like all Islamic art, it encompasses a diverse array of works created in a wide variety of contexts. The prevalence of calligraphy in Islamic art is not directly related to its non-figural tradition; rather, it reflects the centrality of the notion of writing and written text in Islam. Muhammad is said to have said: "The first thing God created was the pen."

Islamic calligraphy developed from two major styles: Kufic and Naskh. There are several variations of each, as well as regionally specific styles. Islamic calligraphy has also been incorporated into modern art beginning with the post-colonial period in the Middle East, as well as the more recent style of calligraffiti.

== Architecture ==
Islamic architecture is the range of architectural styles of buildings associated with Islam. It encompasses both secular and religious styles from the early history of Islam to the present day. Early Islamic architecture was influenced by Roman, Byzantine, Persian and all other lands which the Muslims conquered in the 7th and 8th centuries. Further east, it was also influenced by Chinese and Indian architecture as Islam spread to the Southeast Asia. Later it developed distinct characteristics in the form of buildings, and the decoration of surfaces with Islamic calligraphy and geometric and interlace patterned ornament. The principal Islamic architectural types for large or public buildings are: the Mosque, the Tomb, the Palace and the Fort. From these four types, the vocabulary of Islamic architecture is derived and used for other buildings such as public baths, fountains and domestic architecture.

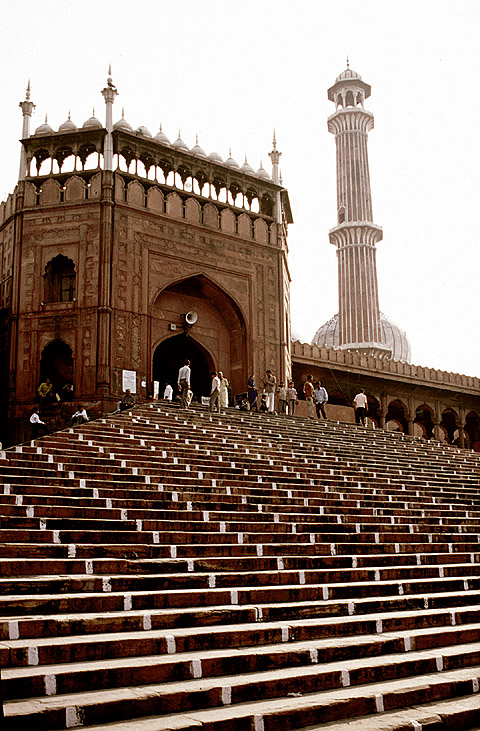
Northeast entrance to Delhi, India's Jama Masjid.

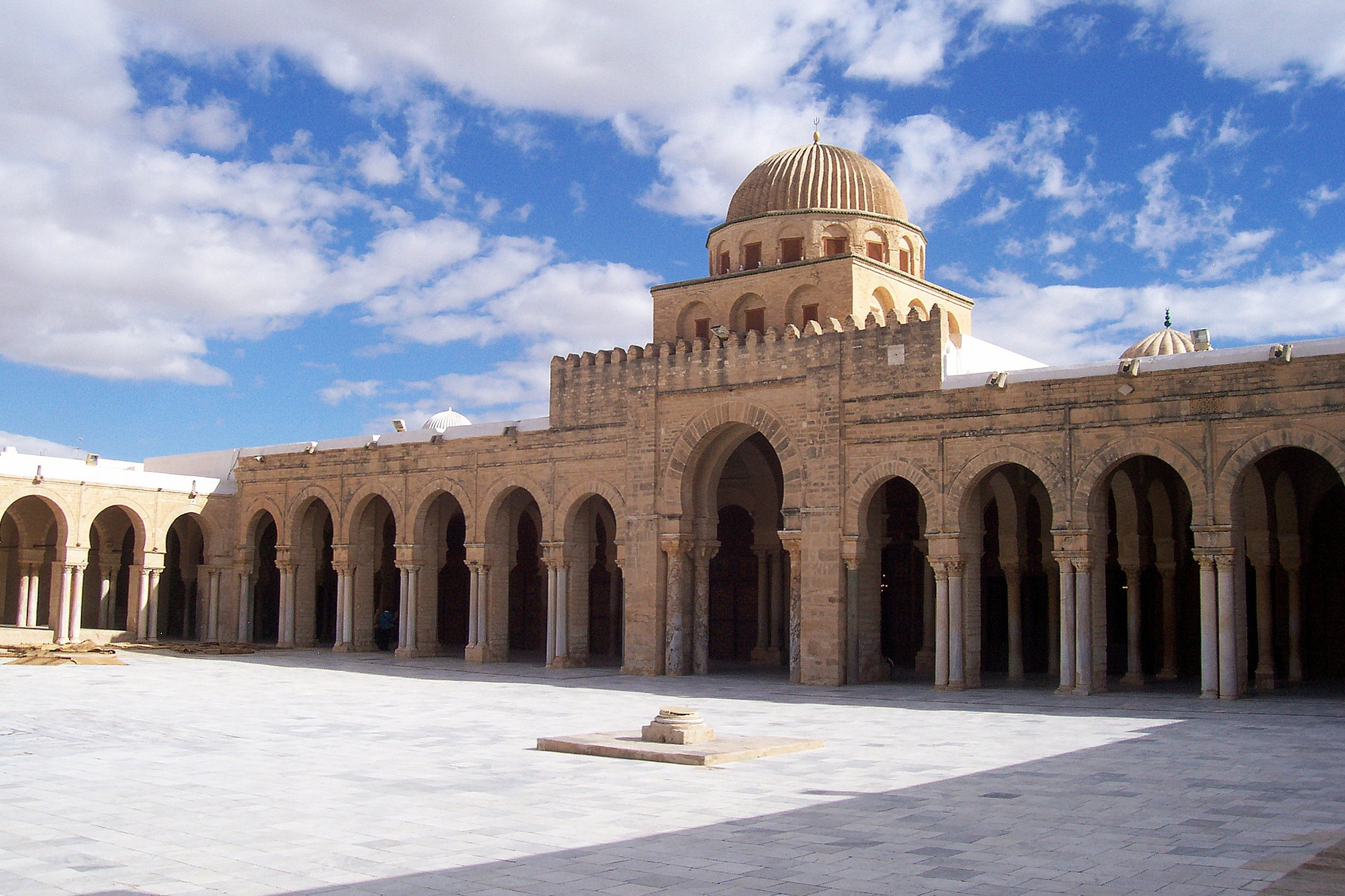
The Great Mosque of Kairouan also called the Mosque of Uqba is at the same time the oldest mosque in North Africa (founded in 670 and still used as a place of worship) and one of the most important monuments of Islamic civilisation, situated in Kairouan, Tunisia.

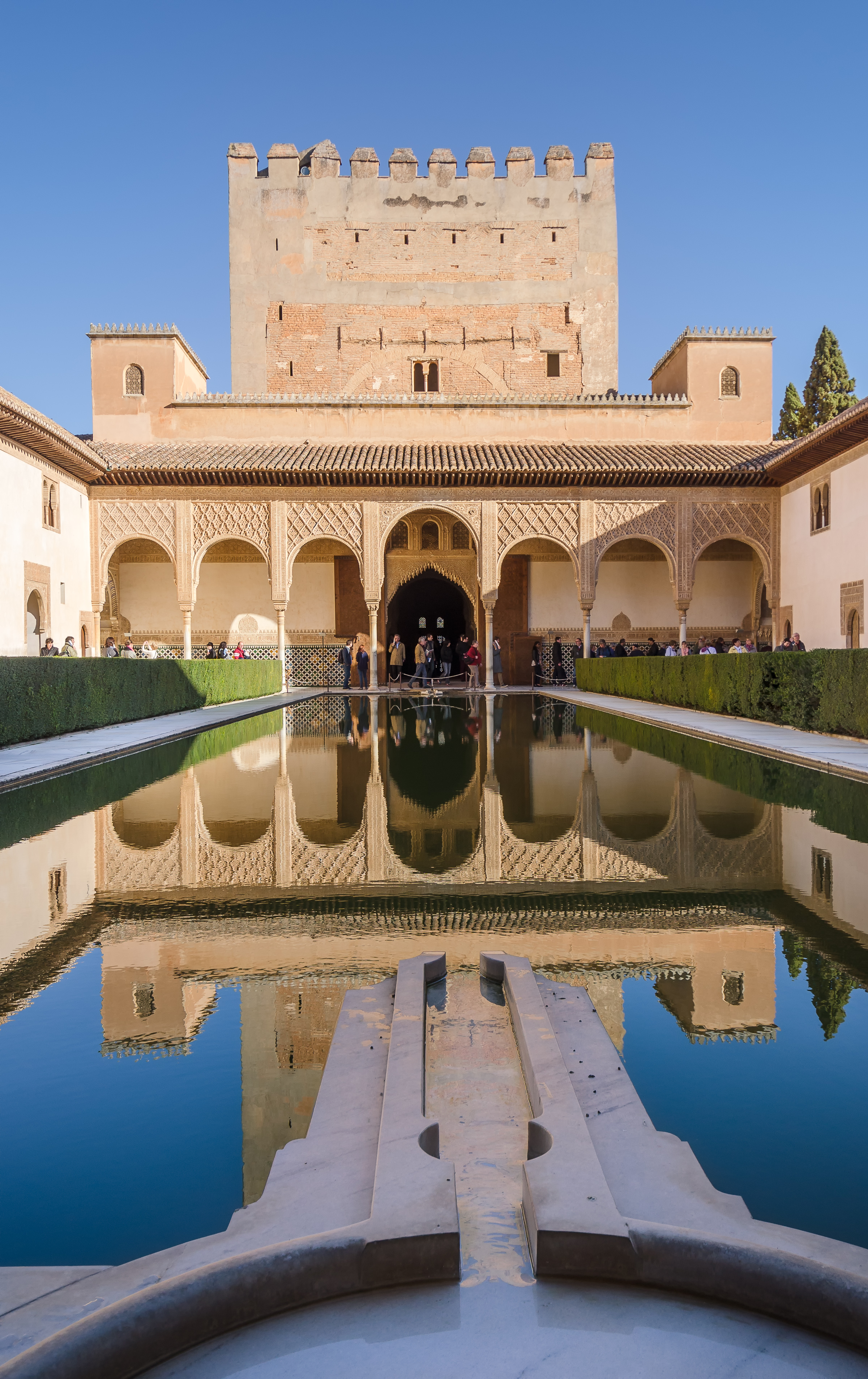
The fortress-palace of Alhambra, built in the 11th century, is a large monument and a popular tourist attraction.

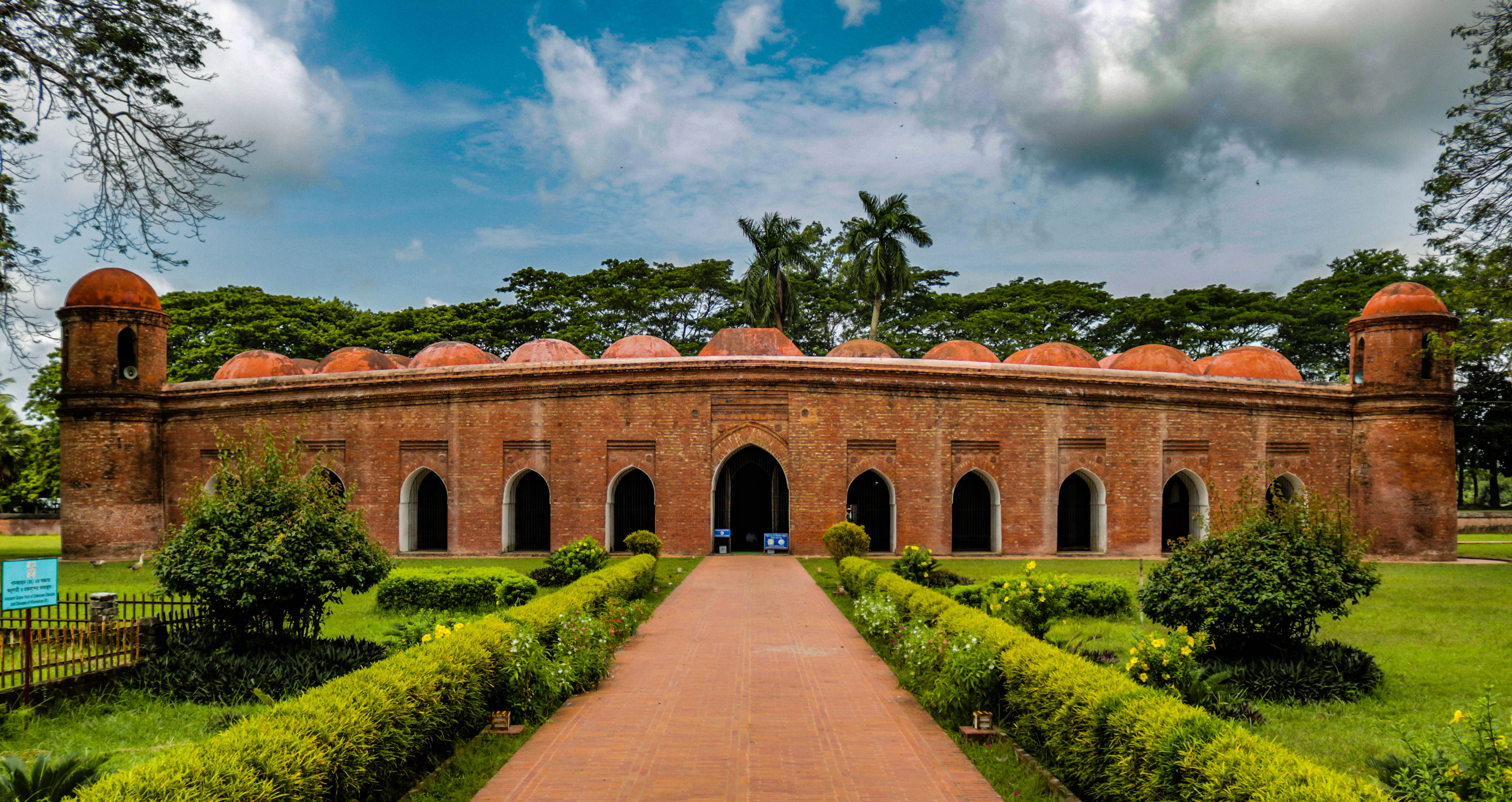
The 15th-century Sixty Dome Mosque of Khalifatabad in Bangladesh is an example of the Bengal Sultanate architecture.

=== Elements of Islamic style ===
Islamic architecture may be identified with the following design elements, which were inherited from the first mosque built by Muhammad in Medina, as well as from other pre-Islamic features adapted from churches and synagogues.

- Large courtyards often merged with a central prayer hall (originally a feature of the Masjid al-Nabawi).
- Minarets or towers (which were originally used as torch-lit watchtowers for example in the Great Mosque of Damascus; hence the derivation of the word from the Arabic nur, meaning "light"). The oldest standing minaret in the world is the minaret of the Great Mosque of Kairouan (in Tunisia); erected between the 2nd and the 3rd century, it is a majestic square tower consisting of three superimposed tiers of gradual size and decor.
- A mihrab or niche on an inside wall indicating the direction to Mecca. This may have been derived from previous uses of niches for the setting of the torah scrolls in Jewish synagogues or Mehrab (Persian: مِهراب) of Persian Mitraism culture or the wikt:haikal of Coptic churches.
- Domes (the earliest Islamic use of which was in the 8th-century mosque of Medina).
- Use of iwans to intermediate between different sections.
- Use of geometric shapes and repetitive art (arabesque).
- Use of decorative Arabic calligraphy.
- Use of symmetry.
- Ablution fountains.
- Use of bright colour.
- Focus on the interior space of a building rather than the exterior.

== Theatre ==
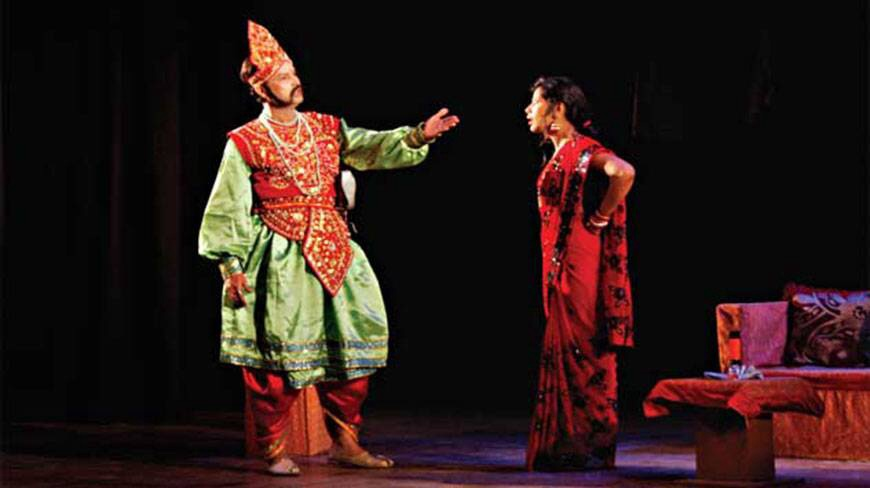
A Jatra theatrical performance in Bangladesh

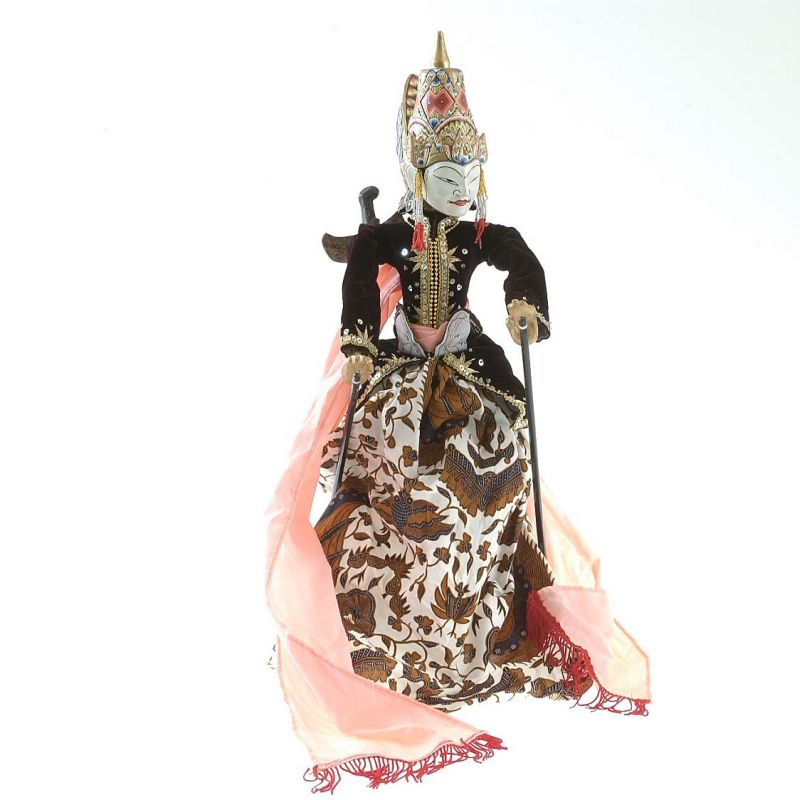
The Indonesian puppet of Amir Hamzah, in Wayang theatre

Theatre is generally considered permitted in Islam. The most popular forms of theatre in the medieval Islamic world were puppet theatre (which included hand puppets, shadow plays and marionette productions) and live passion plays known as ta'ziya, where actors re-enact episodes from Muslim history. In particular, Shia Islamic plays revolved around the shaheed (martyrdom) of Ali's sons Hasan ibn Ali and Husayn ibn Ali. Live secular plays were known as akhraja, recorded in medieval adab literature, though they were less common than puppetry and ta'ziyeh theatre.

One of the oldest, and most enduring, forms of puppet theatre is the Wayang of Indonesia. Although it narrates primarily pre-Islamic legends, it is also an important stage for Islamic epics such as the adventures of Amir Hamzah (pictured). Islamic Wayang is known as Wayang Sadat or Wayang Menak.

Karagoz, the Turkish Shadow Theatre has influenced puppetry widely in the region. It is thought to have passed from China by way of India. Later it was taken by the Mongols from the Chinese and transmitted to the Turkish peoples of Central Russia. Thus the art of Shadow Theatre was brought to Anatolia by the Turkish people emigrating from Central Asia. Other scholars claim that shadow theatre came to Anatolia in the 16th century from Egypt. The advocates of this view claim that when Yavuz Sultan Selim conquered Egypt in 1517, he saw shadow theatre performed during an extacy party put on in his honour. Yavuz Sultan Selim was so impressed with it that he took the puppeteer back to his palace in Istanbul. There his 47-year-old son, later Sultan Suleyman the Magnificent, developed an interest in the plays and watched them a great deal. Thus shadow theatre found its way into the Ottoman palaces.

In other areas the style of shadow puppetry known as khayal al-zill – an intentionally metaphorical term whose meaning is best translated as 'shadows of the imagination' or 'shadow of fancy' survives. This is a shadow play with live music .."the accompaniment of drums, tambourines and flutes...also..."special effects" – smoke, fire, thunder, rattles, squeaks, thumps, and whatever else might elicit a laugh or a shudder from his audience"

In Iran puppets are known to have existed much earlier than 1000, but initially only glove and string puppets were popular in Iran. Other genres of puppetry emerged during the Qajar era (18th–19th century) as influences from Turkey spread to the region. Kheimeh Shab-Bazi is a Persian traditional puppet show which is performed in a small chamber by a musical performer and a storyteller called a morshed or naghal. These shows often take place alongside storytelling in traditional tea and coffee-houses (Ghahve-Khave). The dialogue takes place between the morshed and the puppets. Puppetry remains very popular in Iran, the touring opera Rostam and Sohrab puppet opera being a recent example.

The Royal Opera House in Muscat, Oman. It is considered to be the first opera house linking Islamic culture with classical music.

Following the independence of Pakistan in 1947, religion-based nationalism was strong and affected the theatre in both wings of the country. In East Pakistan (modern-day Bangladesh), playwrights emerged such as Ibrahim Khan (1894–1978), Ibrahim Khalil (b. 1916), Akbar ad-Din (1895–1978) and others. These playwrights would create plays related to the Islamic history of the subcontinent and Middle East, glorifying past Muslim rulers as well as the history of the Pakistan Movement.

== Dance ==
Some scholars of Islamic fiqh pronounced gender based rulings on dance, making it permissible for women within a female only environment, as is often performed at celebrations, but discouraging men to engage in it. Other classical authorities including al-Ghazzali and al-Nawawi allow it without this distinction, but criticised dancing which is "languid" or excites carnal lusts.

Most of the religious orders (tariqa) which dominate traditional Muslim religious life practice ritualised forms of dance in the context of dhikr ceremonies. Dhikr, "recollection" (of God) is a meditative form of worship different from ritual prayer where the seeker focuses all of his senses and thoughts on God in the hope of attaining maarifat (experiential knowledge of God) and triggering mystic states within him- or herself. Dhikr can be performed individually or with like-minded followers under the direction of a sheikh, and can involve silent meditation or repetition and visualisation of sacred words such as the 99 names of God or Quranic phrases, and may be done at rest or with rhythmic movements and controlling one's breath. Traditional Islamic orders have developed varied dhikr exercises including sometimes highly elaborate ritual dances accompanied by Sufi poetry and classical music.

Al-Ghazzali discussed the use of music and dancing in dhikr and the mystical states it induces in worshippers, as well as regulating the etiquette attached to these ceremonies, in his short treatise on Islamic spirituality The Alchemy of Happiness and in his highly influential work The Revival of the Religious Sciences. Al-Ghazzali emphasized how the practices of music and dance are beneficial to religious seekers, as long as their hearts are pure before engaging in these practices.

Notable examples include the Mevlevi Order founded by Jalaluddin Rumi, which was the main Sunni order of the Ottoman Empire, and its sama ritual (known in the West as "the whirling dervishes"). The Mevlevi order, its rituals and Ottoman classical music has been banned in Turkey through much of the 20th century as part of the country's drive towards secular "modernisation", and the order's properties have been expropriated and the country's mosques put out of its control, which has radically diminished its influence in modern Turkey. In 2008, UNESCO confirmed the "Mevlevi Sama Ceremony" of Turkey as one of the Masterpieces of the Oral and Intangible Heritage of Humanity, and the practice is now regaining interest.

In Egypt and the Levant, the Mevlevi form of sama is known as tannoura and has been adopted (with some modifications) by other Sufi orders as well.

The Chishti order, traditionally the dominant Islamic institution in Afghanistan and the Indian subcontinent and the most ancient of the major Sufi orders, also practices forms of sama similar to the Mevlevis, as well as other forms of devotional dance. The order is strongly associated with the development of Hindustani classical music and semi-classical devotional genres such as qawwali through famed pioneer figures such as Amir Khusrow. The Chishti order remains one of the largest and strongest Muslim religious orders in the world by far, retaining a vast influence on the spirituality and culture of around 500 million Muslims living in the Indian subcontinent.

Other examples of devotional dance are found in the Maghreb where it is associated with gnawa music, as well as Sub-Saharan Africa and South-East Asia. The Naqshbandi order, predominant among Iran's Sunni minority, is a notable exception in that they do not use music and dancing in the context of dhikr.

In addition to these strictly religious forms of dance, colourful dancing processions traditionally take place in Muslim communities during weddings and public celebrations such as Mawlid, Eid el-Adha, and so on. Many Islamic cultures have also developed classical forms of dance in the context for instance of Mughal, Ottoman, Persian and Javanese court cultures, as well as innumerable local folk and tribal dances (for instance amongst Bedouin, Tuareg and Pashto peoples), and other forms of dance used for entertainment or sometimes healing such as belly dancing (principally associated with Egyptian culture).

Although tariqas and their rituals have been an omnipresent part of Muslim life for most of Islam's history and were largely responsible for the spread of Islam throughout the world, their following and influence has sharply declined since the late 19th century, having been vigorously opposed and combated in turns by the French and British colonial administrations and by Muslim modernists and secularists like Kemal Atatürk, and in recent decades have been the target of vocal opposition by the fundamentalist Wahhabi sect promoted by Saudi Arabia (where most of the heritage associated with Sufism and tariqa was physically destroyed by the state in the 1930s). Wahhabi militant groups such as ISIS and the Taliban are repeatedly targeting dhikr ceremonies in terrorist attacks, notably in Egypt and Pakistan.

== Music ==
Many Muslims are very familiar to listening to music. The classic heartland of Islam is Arabia as well as other parts of the Middle East, North Africa and Central Asia. Because Islam is a multicultural religion, the musical expression of its adherents is diverse.

- Arab classical music
- Religious music in Iran
- Hindustani classical music
- Qawwali music

The Seljuk Turks, a nomadic tribe that converted to Islam, conquered Anatolia (now Turkey), and held the Caliphate as the Ottoman Empire, also had a strong influence on Islamic music. See Turkish classical music.

Sub-Saharan Africa, India, and the Malay Archipelago also have large Muslim populations, but these areas have had less influence than the heartland on the various traditions of Islamic music. For South India, see: Mappila Songs, Duff Muttu.

All these regions were connected by trade long before the Islamic conquests of the 7th century and later, and it is likely that musical styles travelled the same routes as trade goods. However, lacking recordings, we can only speculate as to the pre-Islamic music of these areas. Islam must have had a great influence on music, as it united vast areas under the first caliphs, and facilitated trade between distant lands. Certainly the Sufis, brotherhoods of Muslim mystics, spread their music far and wide.

Alauddin Khan, Ali Akbar Khan, and Gul Mohammad Khan were notable Bengali Muslim exponents of classical music and Runa Laila became widely acclaimed for her musical talents across South Asia in the field of modern music .Nazrul Sangeet is the collection of 4,000 songs and ghazals written by Kazi Nazrul Islam. See articles on Jari gan, O Mon Romzaner Oi Rozar Sheshe, Bhawaiya and Bhatiyali.

See articles on Eid ul-Fitr, Eid ul-Adha, Ashurah (see also Hosay and Tabuik), Mawlid, Lailat al Miraj and Shab-e-baraat.

== Family life ==
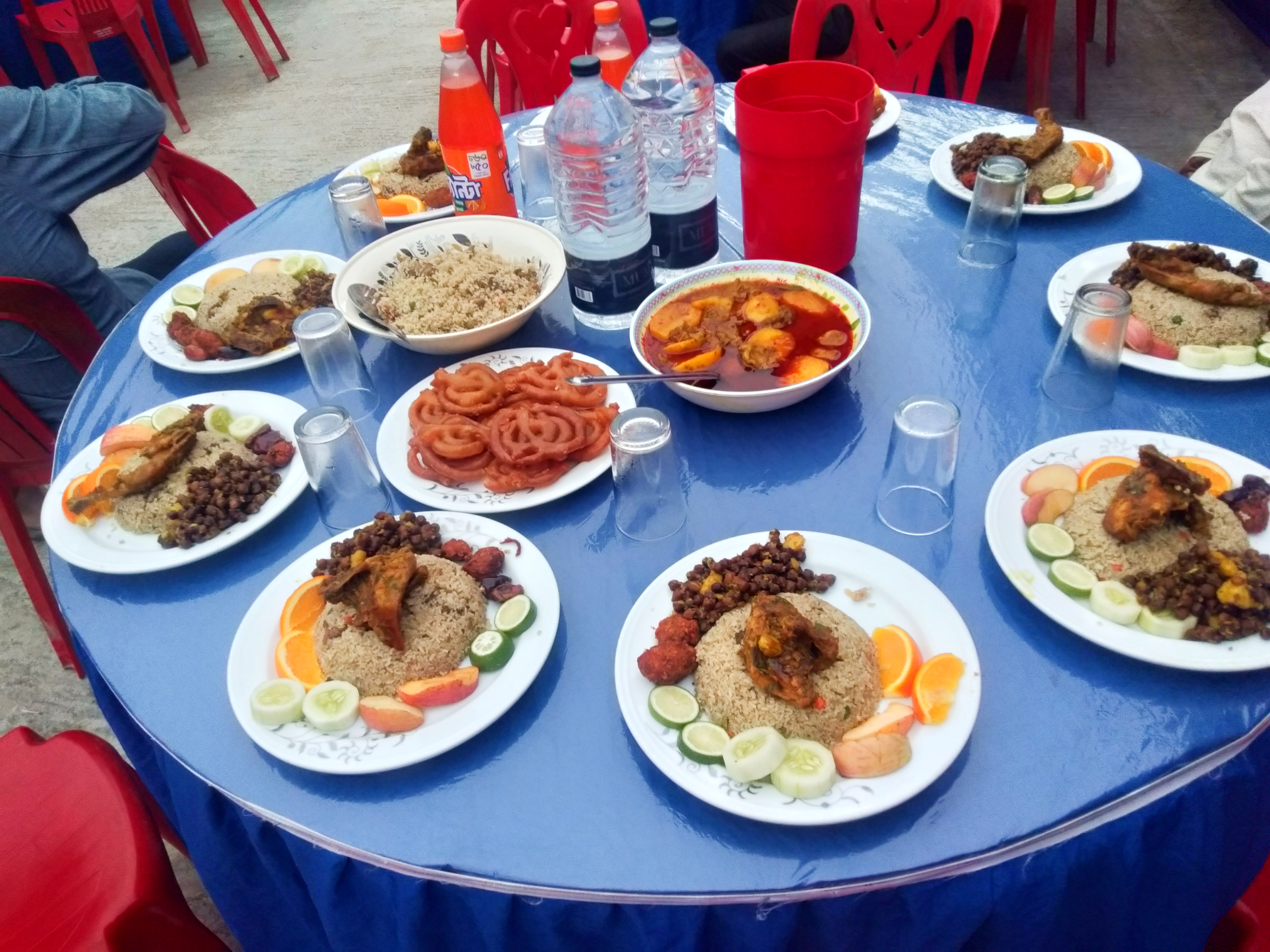
Furir Bari Iftari is the tradition among Bengali Muslims in the Sylhet region of giving Iftar to the household of one's daughter's in-laws during the month of Ramadan.

In a Muslim family, the birth of a child is attended with some religious ceremonies. Immediately after the birth, the words of Adhan is pronounced in the right ear of the child. In the seventh day, the aquiqa ceremony is performed, in which an animal is slaughtered and its meat is distributed among the poor. The head of the child is also shaved, and an amount of money equaling the weight of the child's hair is donated to the poor. Apart from fulfilling the basic needs of food, shelter, and education, the parents or the elderly members of family also undertake the task of teaching moral qualities, religious knowledge, and religious practices to the children. Marriage, which serves as the foundation of a Muslim family, is a civil contract which consists of an offer and acceptance between two qualified parties in the presence of two witnesses. The groom is required to pay a bridal gift (mahr) to the bride, as stipulated in the contract. With Muslims coming from diverse backgrounds including 49 Muslim-majority countries, plus a strong presence as large minorities throughout the world there are many variations on Muslim weddings. Generally in a Muslim family, a woman's sphere of operation is the home and a man's corresponding sphere is the outside world. However, in practice, this separation is not as rigid as it appears.

Certain religious rites are performed during and after the death of a Muslim. Those near a dying man encourage him to pronounce the Shahada as Muslims want their last word to be their profession of faith. After the death, the body is appropriately bathed by the members of the same gender and then enshrouded in a threefold white garment called kafan. Placing the body on a bier, it is first taken to a mosque where funeral prayer is offered for the dead person, and then to the graveyard for burial.

== Events and activities ==
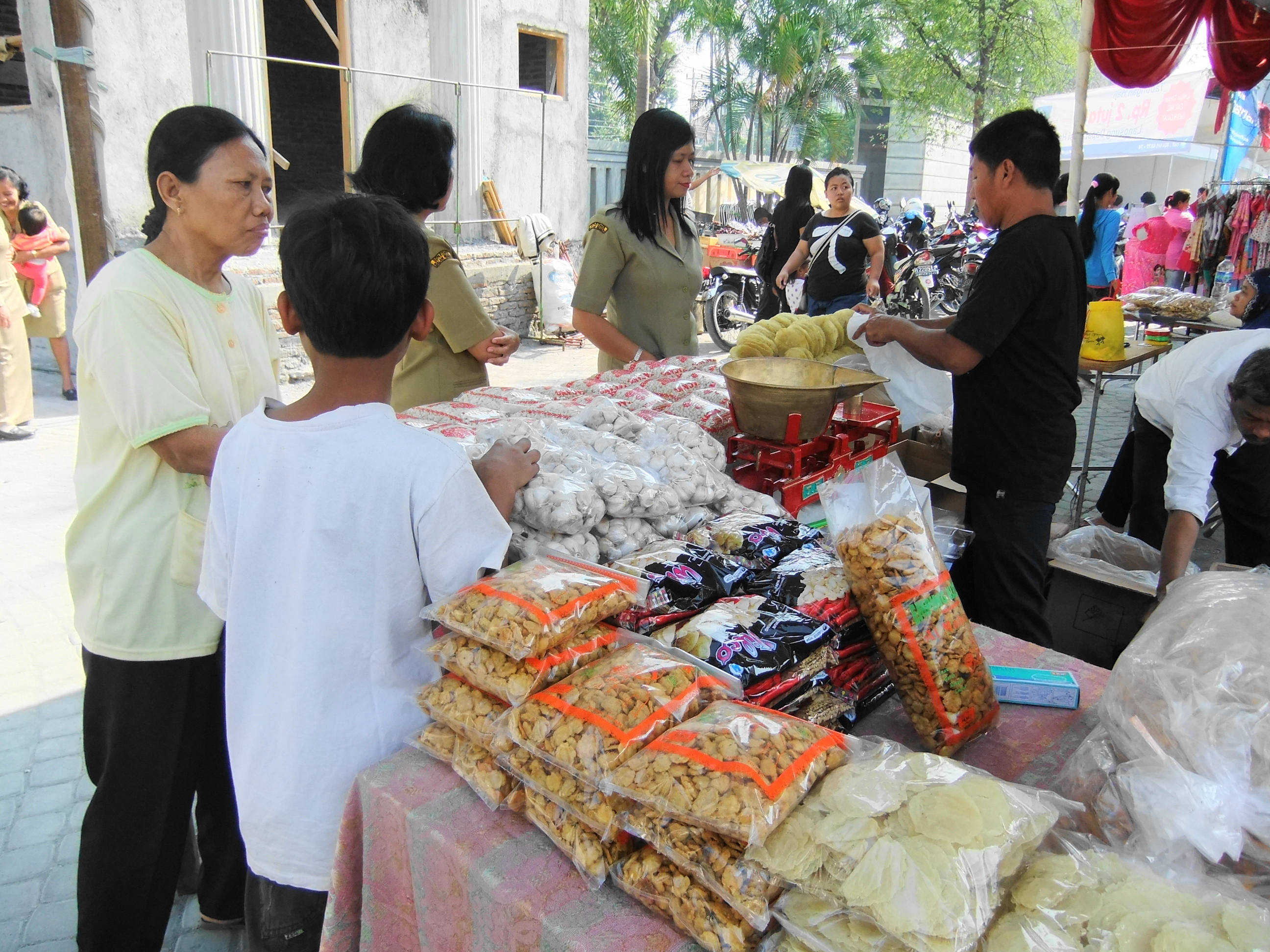
Lebaran bazaar in Semarang offering food and clothes for lebaran holiday in Semarang, Central Java, Indonesia

- Waz Mahfil
- Ijtema
- Mehfil
- Tabligh
- Lebaran
- Mudik

== Etiquette and diet ==
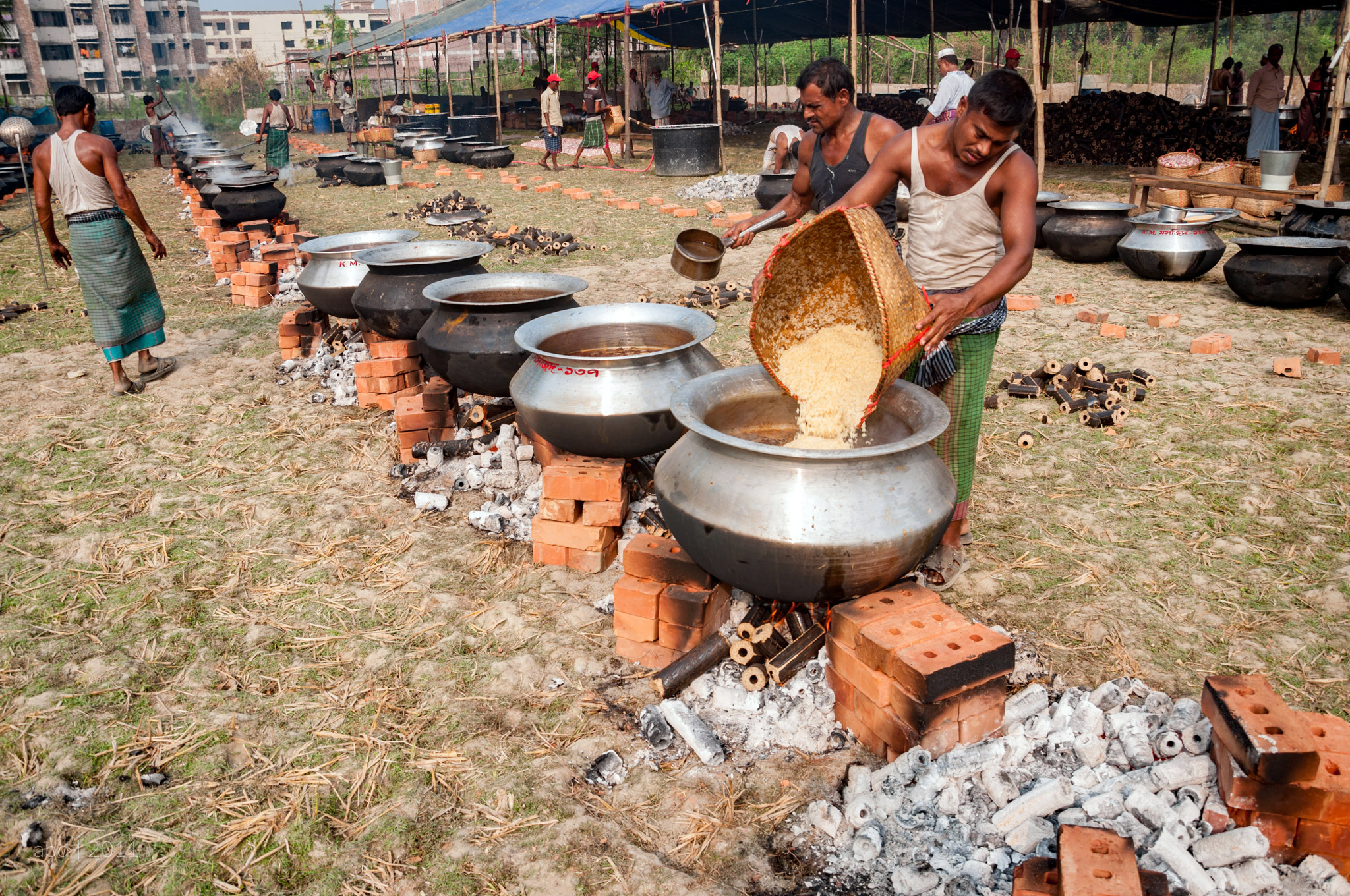
Bengali tradition of Mezban cooking in Chittagong

Many practices fall in the category of adab, or Islamic etiquette. This includes greeting others with "as-salamu 'alaykum" ("peace be unto you"), saying bismillah ("in the name of God") before meals, and using only the right hand for eating and drinking. Islamic hygienic practices mainly fall into the category of personal cleanliness and health. Circumcision of male offspring is also practiced in Islam. Islamic burial rituals include saying the Salat al-Janazah ("funeral prayer") over the bathed and enshrouded dead body, and burying it in a grave.

Muslims are restricted in their diet. Prohibited foods include pork products, blood, carrion, and alcohol. All meat must come from a herbivorous animal slaughtered in the name of God by a Muslim, Jew, or Christian, with the exception of game that one has hunted or fished for oneself. Food permissible for Muslims is known as halal food. It is indicated in these verses of Quran, guidelines for Muslims about the consumption of meat:

He has only forbidden you ˹to eat˺ carrion, blood, swine, and what is slaughtered in the name of any other than Allah. But if someone is compelled by necessity—neither driven by desire nor exceeding immediate need—then surely Allah is All-Forgiving, Most Merciful.

— Quran (An-Nahl, Verse 115)

Tell them (O Muhammad!): 'I do not find in what has been revealed to me anything forbidden for anyone who wants to eat unless it is carrion, outpoured blood and the flesh of swine, all of which is unclean; or that which is profane having been slaughtered in a name other than that of Allah. But whosoever is constrained to it by necessity – this – neither desiring to disobey nor exceeding the limit of necessity – your Lord is surely All Forgiving, All-Compassionate.

— Quran (Al An'am, Verse 145)

Forbidden to you is that which dies of itself, and blood, and flesh of swine, and that on which any other name than that of Allah has been invoked, and the strangled (animal) and that beaten to death, and that killed by a fall and that killed by being smitten with the horn, and that which wild beasts have eaten, except what you slaughter, and what is sacrificed on stones set up (for idols) and that you divide by the arrows; that is a transgression. This day have those who disbelieve despaired of your religion, so fear them not, and fear Me. This day have I perfected for you your religion and completed My favor on you and chosen for you Islam as a religion; but whoever is compelled by hunger, not inclining willfully to sin, then surely Allah is Forgiving, Merciful.

— Quran (Al-Maidah, Verse 3)

== Martial arts ==
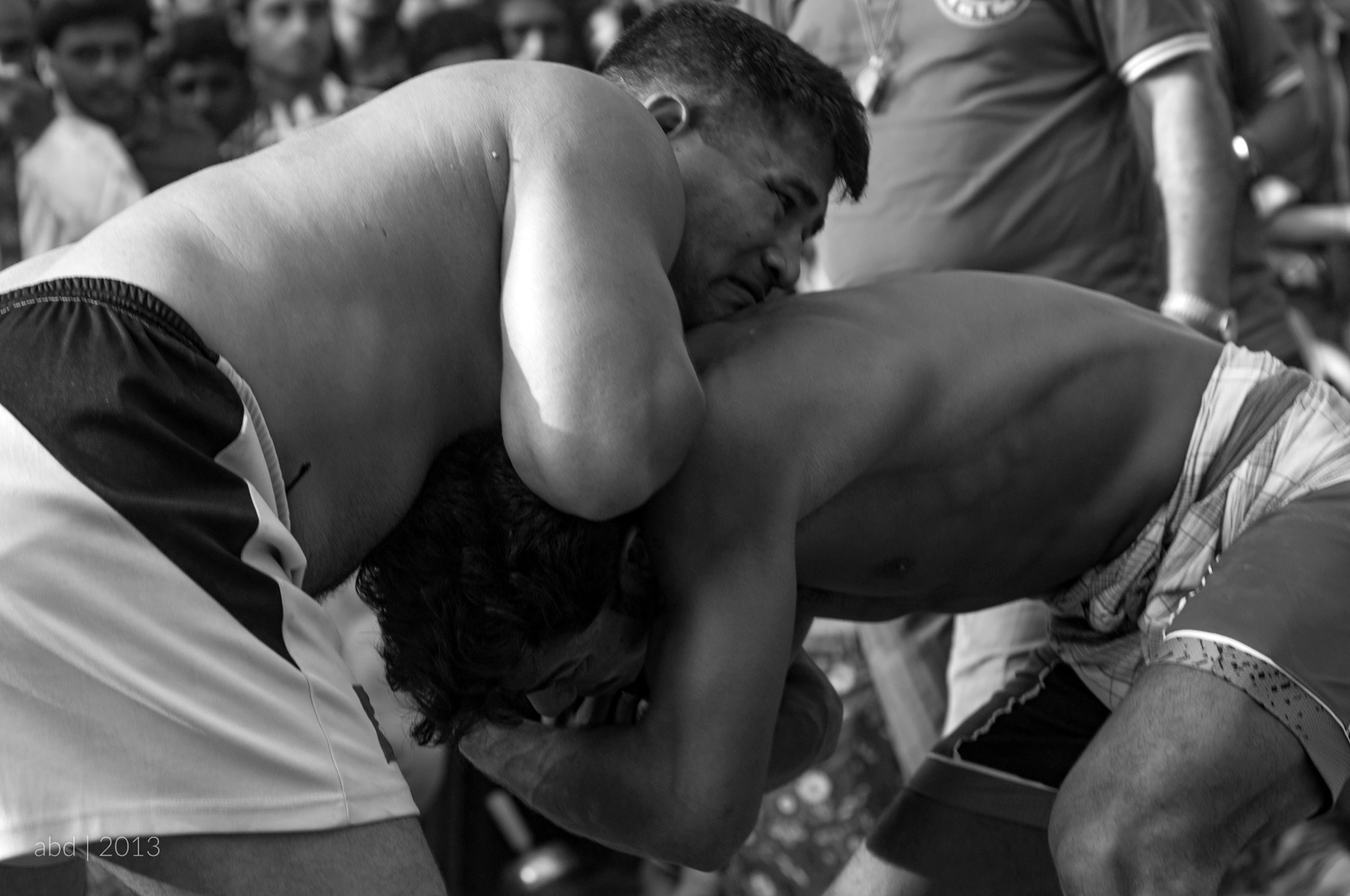
A scene from Jobbarer Boli Khela in the occasion of Pohela Boishakh, a type Bengali martial art

- Pahlavani – Iran
- Yağlı güreş – Turkey
- Gatka – Pakistan
- Kurash – Central Asia
- Istunka – Somalia
- Nuba fighting – Sudan
- Tahtib – Egypt
- Laamb Wrestling – Senegal
- Dambe – Nigeria
- Jobbarer Boli Khela – Bangladesh
- Mokkar Boli Khela – Bangladesh
- Lathi Khela – Bangladesh
- Sqay – India
- Pencak silat – Indonesia
- Bakti Negara – Indonesia
- Kuntao – Indonesia
- Tarung Derajat – Indonesia
- Silat – Indonesia
- Silat Melayu – Malaysia
- Seni Gayung Fatani – Malaysia
- Seni Gayong – Malaysia
- Tomoi – Malaysia
- Lian padukan – Malaysia
- Furusiyya – West Asian

== See also ==
- Cultural Muslim
- Islamicate
- Islam in South Asia
- Islamic advice literature
- Islamic literature
- Muslim meme
