= Hem Chandra Chowdhury =

Hemchandra Chowdhury
- হেমচন্দ্র চৌধুরী
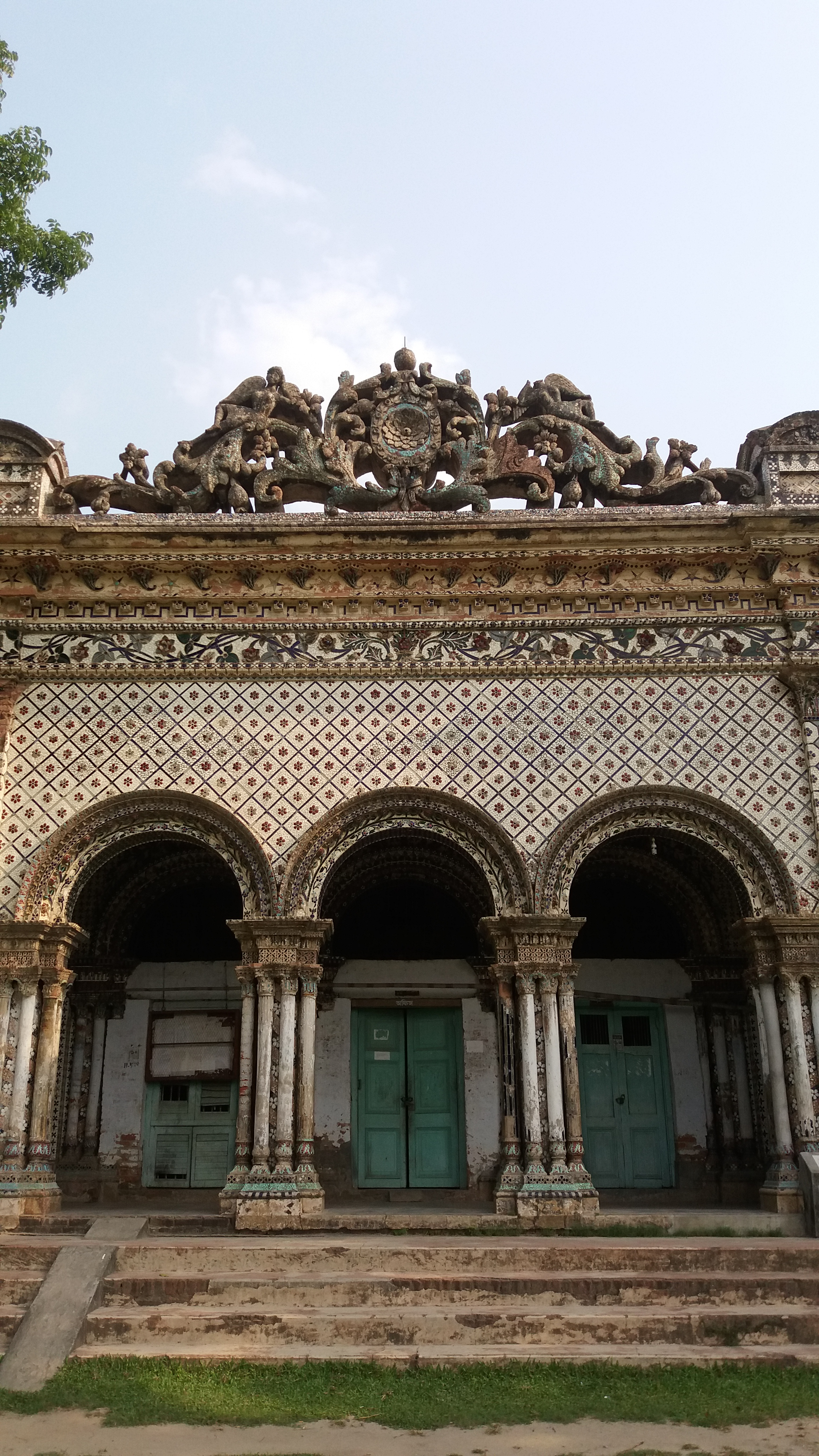
- Hemnagar Palace, built by Hem Chandra Chowdhury
- Born: Hem Chandra; 1833; Ambaria, Madhupur, Tangail, Bangladesh
- Died: 1915 (aged 81–82); Varanasi, India
- Resting place: Calcutta, India
- Education: Presidency College
- Title: Zamindar of Hemnagar

Hemchandra Choudhury (1833-1915) was a Hindu Zamindar in Gopalpur Upazila in Tangail in what is now Bangladesh.

== Early life ==
Hemchandra Banerjee Choudhury was born in 1833 in Brahmin family of Ambaria, Madhupur Upazila, Tangail District. He was born in the Ambaria Zamindar family. His father was Kalichandra Banerjee Choudhury a pious Brahmin. He was educated at the Presidency University in Calcutta.

== Career ==
Choudhury moved his residence from Ambaria to the village of Subornokhali, then an important port on the Jamuna River, and in 1890 built Hemnagar Zamindar Bari or Hemnagar Palace (also known as Parir Dalan) three kilometres to the south-east; the area was named Hemnagar after him. The palace sheltered freedom fighters during the Bangladesh War of Liberation and in 1989 the main portion was leased to Hemnagar Degree College.

Choudhury built the first concrete road in the upazila, from Subornokhali to Jagannathganj Ghat, and was instrumental in having the railway extended to Jagannathganj Ghat in 1905. He also established the Shashimukhi English High School, named after his mother. He donated land for the construction of Gopalpur High School. He donated for the construction of Barisal School for the Deaf and Dumb, Dhaka Medical School (current name Sir Salimullah Medical College), Gopalpur Girls School, and Pingna English High School. The Barisal School for the Deaf and Dumb was established in 1911. He donated money for the construction of Mymensingh Victorial Hospital, Pingna Charitable Hospital, and the Mymensingh Hospital. He founded the Hemnagar Haradurga Devi Choudhurani Charity Hospital in 1901. He published a periodical called Hemnagar Hitoishi. He wrote and published a number of poetry books.

== Death and legacy ==
Choudhury died in Varanasi in 1915, aged 82. After his death Hemnagar Union was renamed after him. Hemnagar Union, as of 2001, has 36,517 inhabitants.

After Hemchandra Choudhury's death, his successors crossed the country in fear of communal riots during the partition of India and Pakistan in 1946. Shyamkanta Ganguly and his son Kamal Ganguly went to Hemnagar, but during the war of 1965, they also emigrated. During the Bangladesh War of Liberation, the Rajbari of Hemanagar was used as a shelter for the freedom fighters.

His descendants currently live in parts of Bangladesh, West Bengal and Other parts of the country Indiathey married into Maharaja (King) Kaliprasad Mukhopadhayay's family and the Tagore family, of which Rabindranath Tagore became the first Asian to win the Nobel Prize in Literature.

His great-granddaughter, Indrani Roy (1943-2016), continued his socialist work. She was part of the first generation of feminist Bengali poets writing after the Partition of Bengal, and one of the founding members of the Aurobindo Nari Chetana Mancha (The Aurobindo Society for Women's Empowerment), a feminist writers' society in Calcutta under the Sri Aurobindo Foundation for Indian Culture (SAFIC),
