= Mirzapur Union, Gopalpur =

Mirzapur Union মির্জাপুর ইউনিয়ন
- Location of Mirzapur Union in Bangladesh
- Coordinates: 24.5169564°N 89.9323127°E
- Country: Bangladesh
- Division: Dhaka Division
- District: Tangail District
- Upazila: Gopalpur Upazila
- Established: 1984

Government
  - Type: Union Council
  - Chairman: Halimuzzaman Talukdar (Bangladesh Awami League)

Area
  - Total: 22.62 km^{2} (8.73 sq mi)
- Elevation: 18 m (59 ft)

Population (2011)
  - Total: 27,359
  - Density: 1,210/km^{2} (3,133/sq mi)
- Time zone: UTC+6 (BST)
- Postal code: 1990
- Website: https://mirzapurup.tangail.gov.bd/

Mirzapur Union (Bengali: মির্জাপুর ইউনিয়ন) is a union of Gopalpur Upazila, Tangail District, Bangladesh. It is situated 8 kilometres (5.0 mi) southeast of Gopalpur and 55 kilometres (34 mi) north of Tangail, the district headquarters.

== Demographics ==
According to the 2011 Bangladesh census, Mirzapur Union had 7,103 households and a population of 27,359. The literacy rate (age 7 and over) was 42.8% (male: 44.6%, female: 41.2%).

== See also ==
- Union Councils of Tangail District
