= Jhawail Union =

Jhawail Union ঝাওয়াইল ইউনিয়ন
- Location of Jhaoail in Bangladesh
- Coordinates: 24.6°N 89.86°E
- Country: Bangladesh
- Division: Dhaka Division
- District: Tangail District
- Upazila: Gopalpur Upazila
- Established: 1984

Government
  - Type: Union Council
  - Chairman: Md Rafiqul Islam (Bangladesh Awami League)

Area
  - Total: 27.77 km^{2} (10.72 sq mi)
- Elevation: 18 m (59 ft)

Population (2011)
  - Total: 32,675
  - Density: 1,177/km^{2} (3,047/sq mi)
- Time zone: UTC+6 (BST)
- Postal code: 1991
- Website: jhawailup.tangail.gov.bd

Jhawail Union (Bengali: ঝাওয়াইল ইউনিয়ন) is a union of Gopalpur Upazila, Tangail District, Bangladesh. It is situated 58 kilometres (36 mi) north of Tangail.

== Demographics ==
According to the 2011 Bangladesh census, Jhawail Union had 8,355 households and a population of 32,675. The literacy rate (age 7 and over) was 42.3% (male: 44%, female: 40.8%).

== See also ==
- Union Councils of Tangail District
