= Alamnagar Union =

Alamnagar Union আলমনগর ইউনিয়ন
- Location of Alamnagar in Bangladesh
- Coordinates: 24.533333°N 89.916667°E
- Country: Bangladesh
- Division: Dhaka Division
- District: Tangail District
- Upazila: Gopalpur Upazila
- Established on: 1984

Government
  - Type: Union Council
  - Chairman: Professor Abdul Momen (Bangladesh Awami League)

Area
  - Total: 19.33 km^{2} (7.46 sq mi)
- Elevation: 15 m (49 ft)

Population (2011)
  - Total: 19,752
  - Density: 1,022/km^{2} (2,647/sq mi)
- Time zone: UTC+6 (BST)
- Postal code: 1990
- Website: Official Website of Alamnagar Union

Alamnagar Union (Bengali: আলমনগর ই উনিয়ন) is a union of Gopalpur Upazila, Tangail District, Bangladesh. It is situated at 42 km north of Tangail.

== Demographics ==
According to Population Census 2011 performed by Bangladesh Bureau of Statistics, The total population of Alamnagar union is 19752. There are households 5281 in total.

== Education ==
The literacy rate of Alamnagar Union is 41.2% (Male-43.4%, Female-39.1%).

== See also ==
- Union Councils of Tangail District
