= Dhopakandi Union =

Dhopakandi Union ধোপাকান্দি ইউনিয়ন
- Location of Dhopakandi in Bangladesh
- Coordinates: 24.59832881°N 89.96086121°E
- Country: Bangladesh
- Division: Dhaka Division
- District: Tangail District
- Upazila: Gopalpur Upazila
- Established on: 1984

Government
  - Type: Union Council
  - Chairman: Md Abdul Hai

Area
  - Total: 21.88 km^{2} (8.45 sq mi)
- Elevation: 17 m (56 ft)

Population (2011)
  - Total: 25,000
  - Density: 1,100/km^{2} (3,000/sq mi)
- Time zone: UTC+6 (BST)
- Postal code: 1990
- Website: dhopakandiup.tangail.gov.bd

Dhopakandi Union (Bengali: ধোপাকান্দি ইউনিয়ন) is a union of Gopalpur Upazila, Tangail District, Bangladesh. It is situated at 48 km north of Tangail.

== Demographics ==
According to Population Census 2011 performed by Bangladesh Bureau of Statistics, The total population of Dhopakandi union is 25000. There are 6707 households in total.

== Education ==
The literacy rate of Dhopakandi Union is 45.5% (Male-47.4%, Female-43.6%).

== See also ==
- Union Councils of Tangail District
