= Hadira Union =

Hadira Union হাদিরা ইউনিয়ন
- Location of Hadira in Bangladesh
- Coordinates: 24.64951349°N 89.92412567°E
- Country: Bangladesh
- Division: Dhaka Division
- District: Tangail District
- Upazila: Gopalpur Upazila
- Established on: 1984

Government
  - Type: Union Council
  - Chairman: Abul Kashem (Bangladesh Awami League)

Area
  - Total: 25.48 km^{2} (9.84 sq mi)
- Elevation: 15 m (49 ft)

Population (2011)
  - Total: 32,551
  - Density: 1,278/km^{2} (3,309/sq mi)
- Time zone: UTC+6 (BST)
- Postal code: 1990
- Website: hadiraup.tangail.gov.bd

Hadira Union (Bengali: হাদিরা ইউনিয়ন) is a union of Gopalpur Upazila, Tangail District, Bangladesh. It is situated at 56 km north of Tangail.

== Demographics ==
According to Population Census 2011 performed by Bangladesh Bureau of Statistics, The total population of Hadira union is 32551. There are 8036 households in total.

== Education ==
The literacy rate of Hadira Union is 46.6% (Male-49.2%, Female-44.1%).

== See also ==
- Union Councils of Tangail District
