= Nagda Simla Union =

Nagda Simla Union নগদা শিমলা ইউনিয়ন
- Location of Nagda Simla Union in Bangladesh
- Coordinates: 24.6142544°N 89.916561°E
- Country: Bangladesh
- Division: Dhaka Division
- District: Tangail District
- Upazila: Gopalpur Upazila
- Established on: 1984

Government
  - Type: Union Council
  - Chairman: Advocate K.M Abul Kalam Jurat (Bangladesh Awami League)

Area
  - Total: 26.42 km^{2} (10.20 sq mi)
- Elevation: 19 m (62 ft)

Population (2011)
  - Total: 31,436
  - Density: 1,190/km^{2} (3,082/sq mi)
- Time zone: UTC+6 (BST)
- Postal code: 1991
- Website: https://nagdashimlaup.tangail.gov.bd/

Nagda Simla Union (Bengali: নগদা শিমলা ইউনিয়ন) is a union of Gopalpur Upazila, Tangail District, Bangladesh. It is situated 8 km southeast of Gopalpur and 55 km north of Tangail, the District headquarters.

== Demographics ==
According to Population Census 2011 performed by Bangladesh Bureau of Statistics, the total population of Nagda Simla union is 31436. There are 7624 households in total.

== Education ==
The literacy rate of Nagda Simla Union is 47.5% (Male-50.3%, Female-44.7%).

== See also ==
- Union Councils of Tangail District
