= 201 Dome Mosque =

Mosque in Gopalpur Upazila, Jhawail, Bangladesh

- ২০১ গম্বুজ বিশিষ্ট মসজিদ
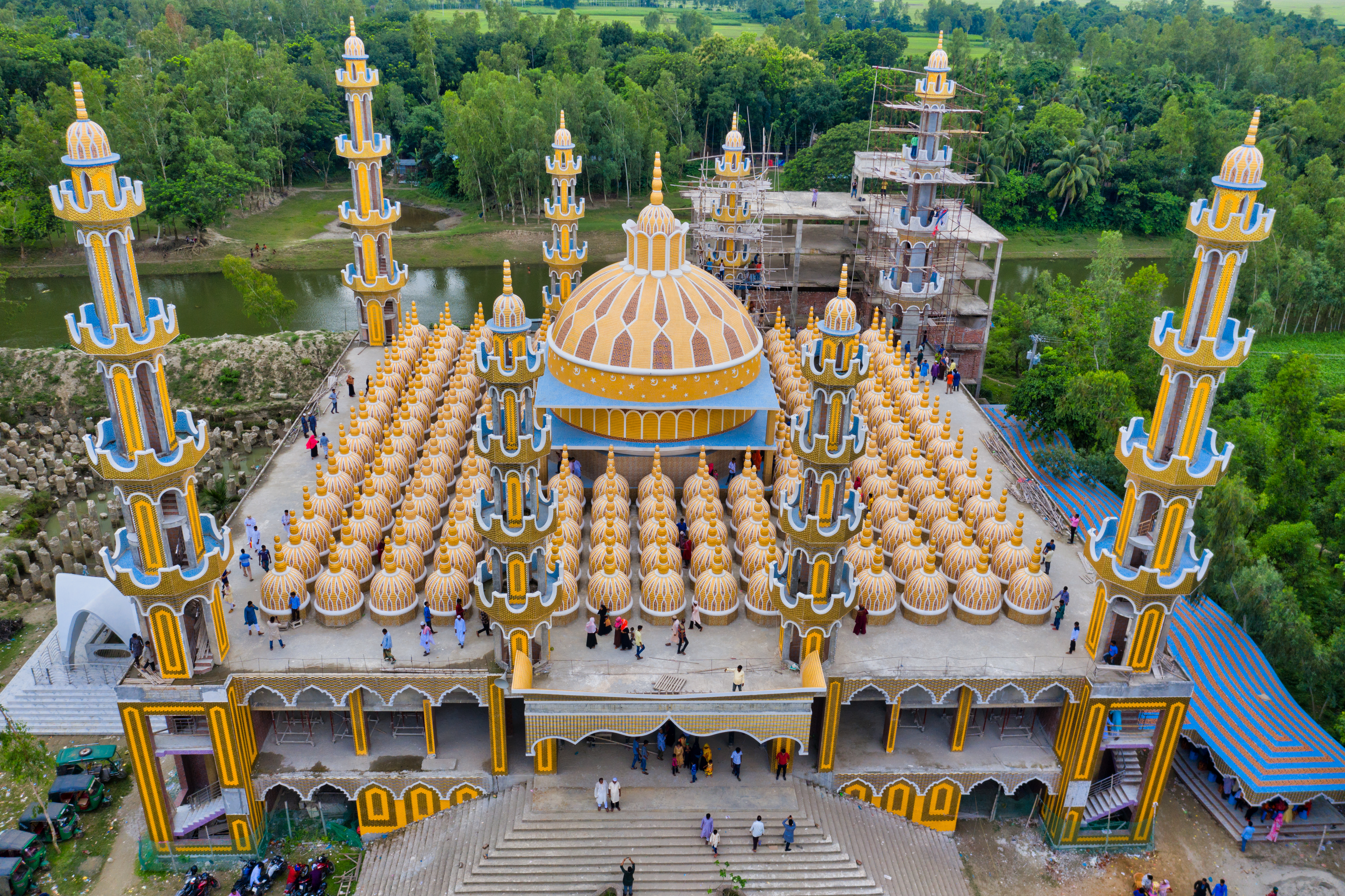
- The mosque in 2019, open, with one minaret under construction

- Location of the mosque in Bangladesh

Religion
- Affiliation: Islam
- Ecclesiastical or organisational status: Mosque
- Status: Active

Location
- Location: Gopalpur Upazila, Jhawail, Tangail District, Dhaka Division
- Country: Bangladesh
- Coordinates: 24°35′54″N 89°52′29″E

Architecture
- Funded by: Heroic Freedom Fighter MD Rafiqul Islam Welfare Trust
- Groundbreaking: 2013
- Completed: 2019
- Construction cost: ৳100 crore

Specifications
- Capacity: 15,000 worshipers
- Length: 44 m (144 ft)
- Width: 44 m (144 ft)
- Dome: 201
- Dome dia. (outer): 25 m (81 ft) (main); 5.2 m (17 ft) (others)
- Minaret: Nine
- Minaret height: 137 m (451 ft) (main); 31 m (101 ft) (corners); 25 m (81 ft) (four inners)
- Materials: Gold, brass, stone, marble, crystal stones

Website
- 201gombujmasjid.org

The 201 Dome Mosque is a large mosque in South Pathalia village, in Tangail District, in the Dhaka Division of Bangladesh. Completed in 2019, the mosque is open 24 hours every day.

== Architecture ==
Construction of the mosque began in 2013 on 15 bighas of land on the east bank of the Jhenai River in South Pathalia village, Nagda Simla Union, Gopalpur Upazila, Tangail District. It was built by the Heroic Freedom Fighter Mohammad Rafiqul Islam Welfare Trust. The estimated cost of construction was BDT 100 crore (US$12.3 million).

The mosque has the capacity to accommodate approximately 15,000 worshippers, with plans to expand the mosque to accommodate 30,000 worshippers.

The mosque is a square building. There are four 31-metre (101 ft) high corner towers, and four shorter 25-metre (81 ft) high towers at the corners of the square space covered by the 25-metre (81 ft) central dome. The central dome is surrounded by 200 smaller 5.2-metre (17 ft) domes. An adjacent 137-metre (451 ft) high minaret has been constructed immediately to the southwest and is the tallest concrete minaret in the world. The western wall of the mosque is inscribed with the entire Qur'an.

In addition to the main worship space, the mosque complex includes an orphanage, an elder care home, and a hospital with free treatment. The complex also features a helipad.

== Gallery ==
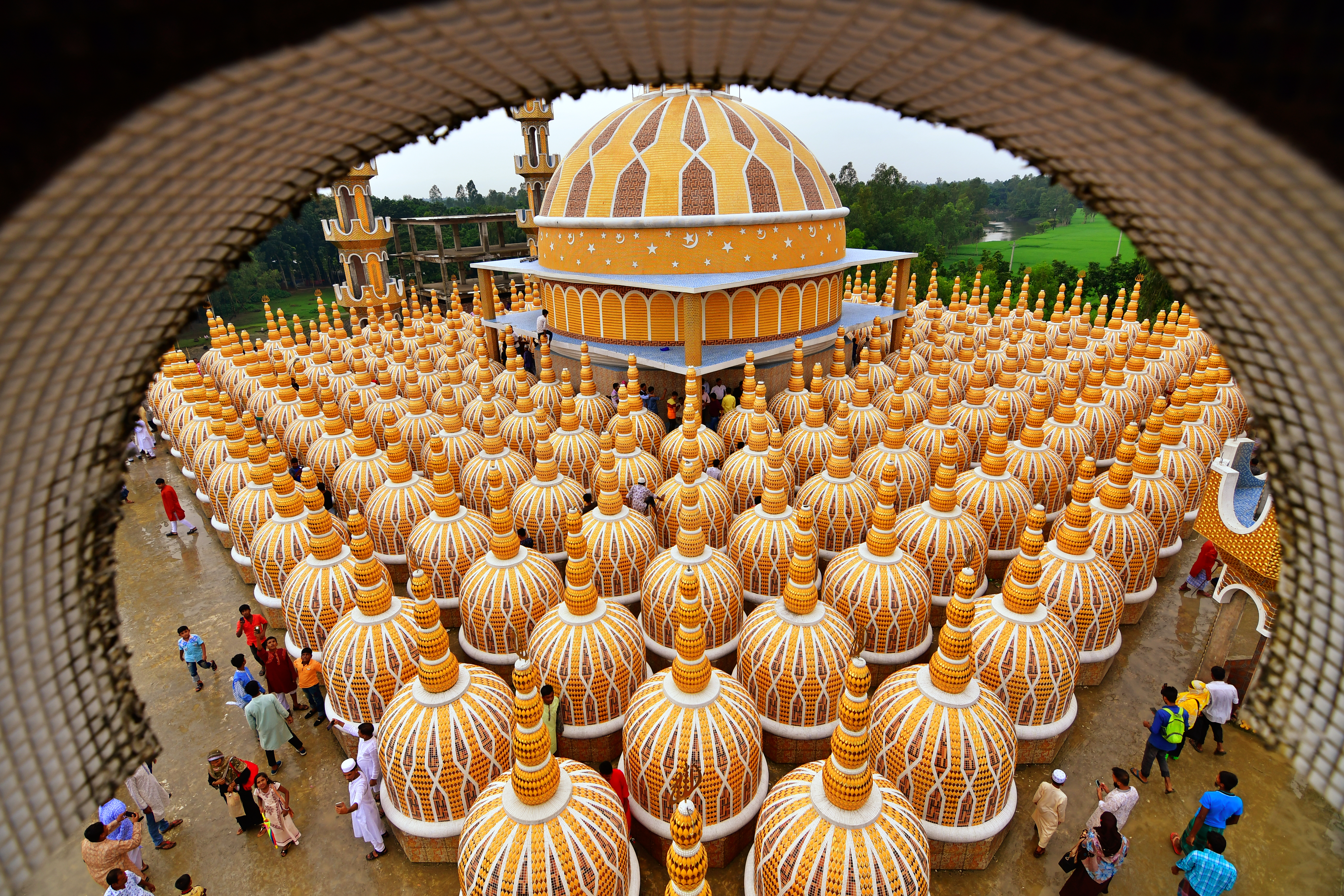
A view of the mosque from one of the minarets.

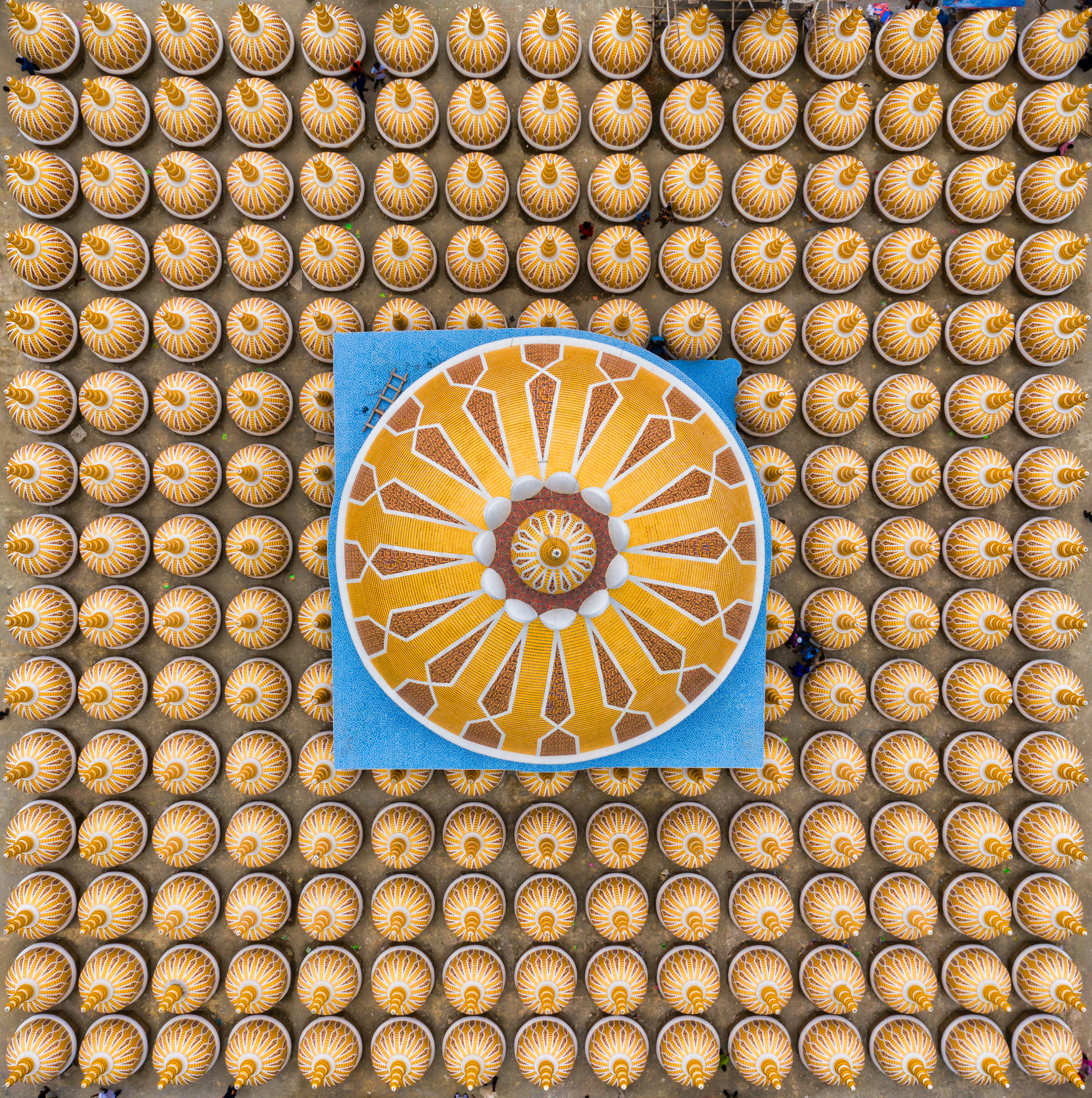
A top-down image of the mosque.

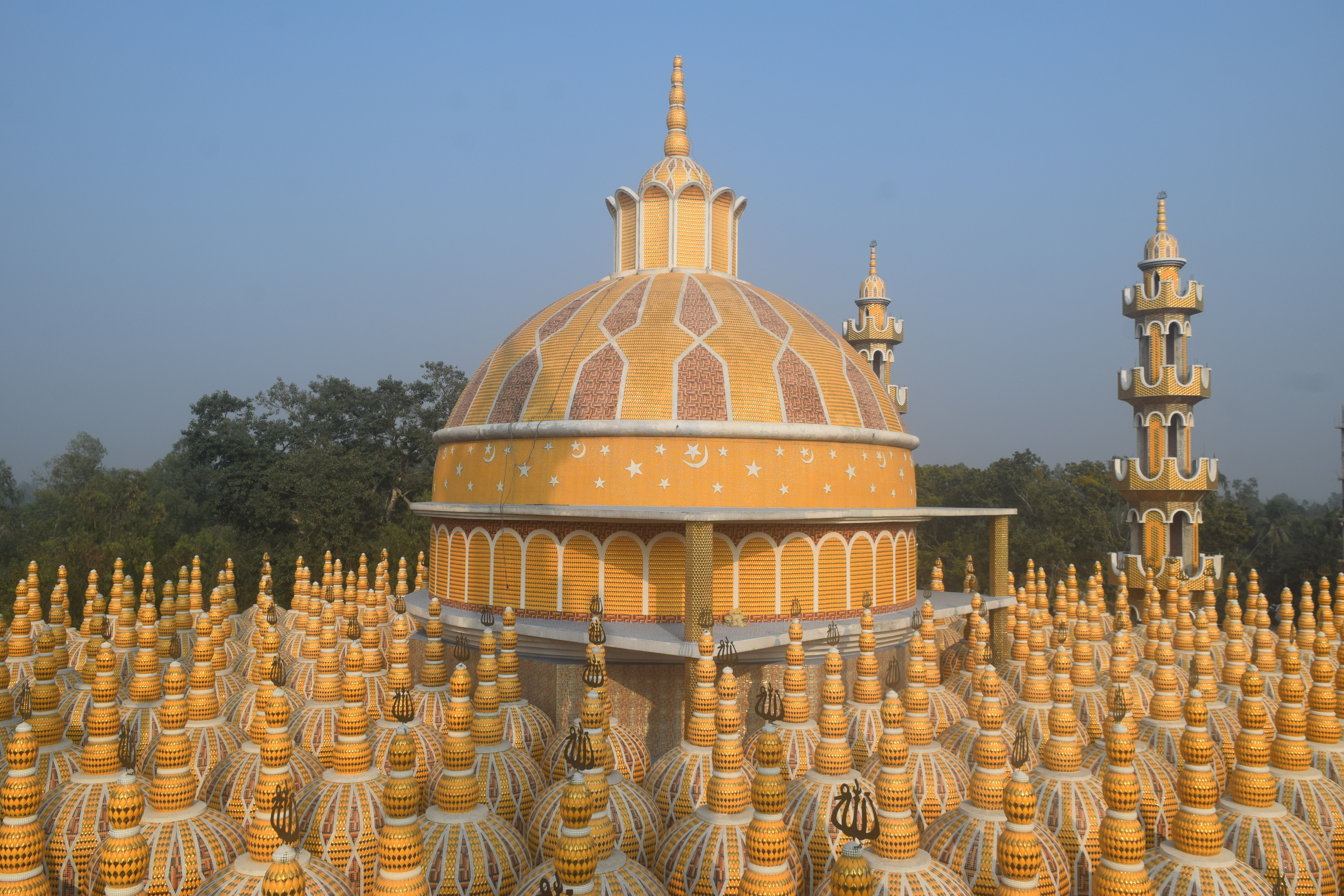
A view of the domes in closer detail.

== See also ==
- Islam in Bangladesh
- List of mosques in Bangladesh
