= Hemnagar Union =

Hemnagar Union হেমনগর ইউনিয়ন
- Location of Hemnagar in Bangladesh
- Coordinates: 24.57085522°N 89.85785365°E
- Country: Bangladesh
- Division: Dhaka Division
- District: Tangail District
- Upazila: Gopalpur Upazila
- Established: 1984

Government
  - Type: Union Council
  - Chairman: MD.Anisur Rahman Talukder(Bangladesh Awami League)

Area
  - Total: 24.85 km^{2} (9.59 sq mi)
- Elevation: 15 m (49 ft)

Population (2011)
  - Total: 33,398
  - Density: 1,344/km^{2} (3,481/sq mi)
- Time zone: UTC+6 (BST)
- Postal code: 1992
- Website: hemnagarup.tangail.gov.bd

Hemnagar Union (Bengali: হেমনগর ইউনিয়ন) is a union of Gopalpur Upazila, Tangail District, Bangladesh. It is situated 52 kilometres (32 mi) north of Tangail.

The area is named for Hem Chandra Chowdhury, a zamindar who built his palace, Hemnagar Zamindar Bari, there in 1890.

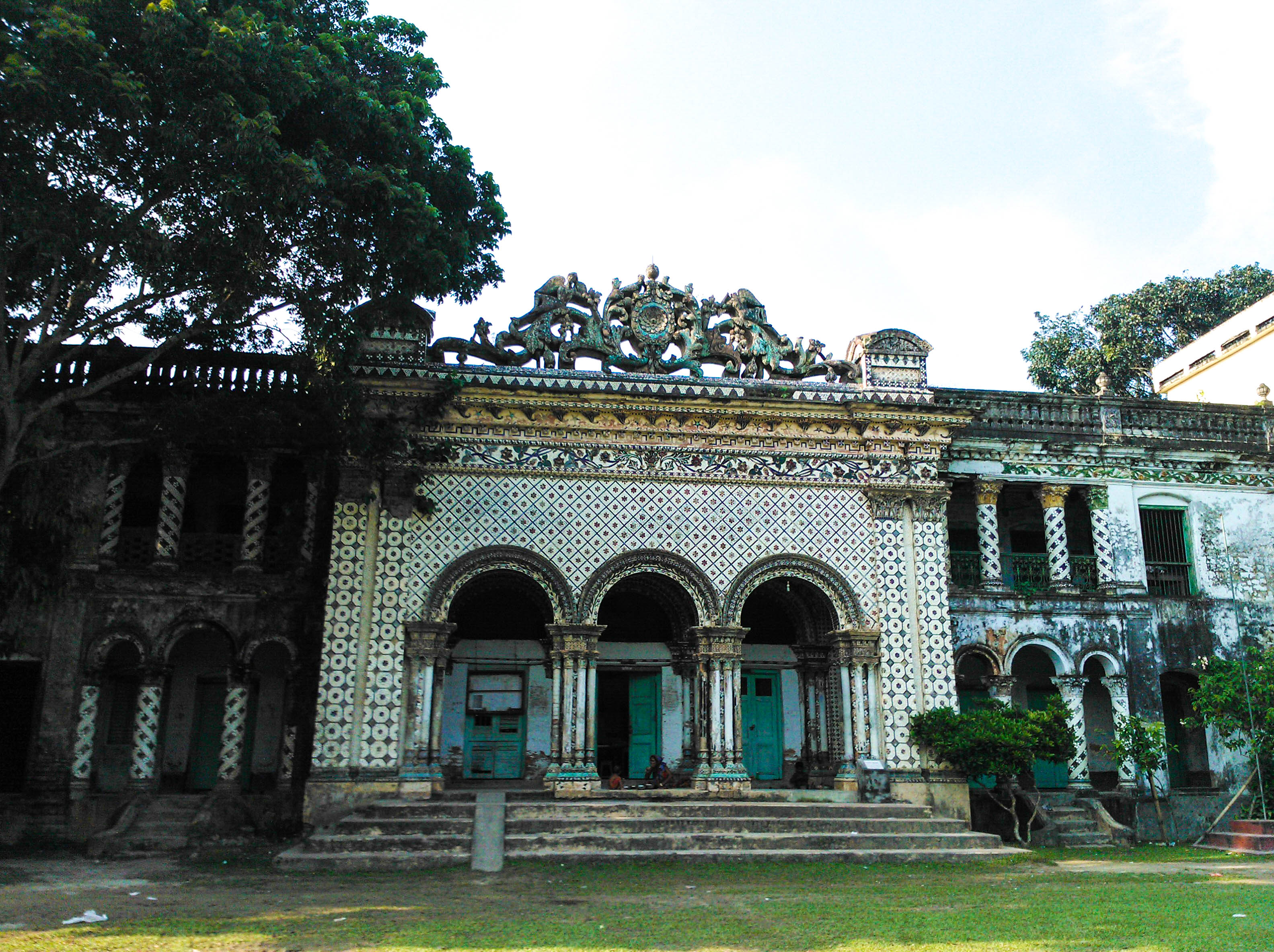
Hemnagar Zamindar Bari or Hemnagar Palace

== Demographics ==
According to the 2011 Bangladesh census, Hemnagar Union had 8,331 households and a population of 33,398. The literacy rate (age 7 and over) was 45.9% (male: 48.1%, female: 43.9%).

== See also ==
- Union Councils of Tangail District
