= Kalibabur Bari =

Place in Janai, Hoogly, West Bengal

Kali Babur Bari ( কালী বাবুর বাড়ি, জনাই) is located in Janai, Hoogly, West Bengal.

== Origin of the Kali Babu's (Maharaja Kaliprasad Mukhopadhayay's) family ==
According to the information available in the "Malebandhan" Pustika, Maharaja Adisur From Kanauj brought with him five most renowned Brahmins among which the most famous was Gangananda who was a disciple of Shri Harsha and it is during this period that Debibar Ghatak created "Malebandhan" and added Upadhyay as the surname, which later modified into Mukhopadhyay (supreme of all the upadhyay's) or Mukherjee (in the later British era).As such Gangananda Bhattacharya Upadhayay was the 1st man in the famous family of Janai.

The two reasons for the popularity of Janai village includes: 1. A sweet named "Monohara" that is famous in all over Bengal, and 2. The story of assessts, grandeur and kindness of the royal family of Janai.

"Monohora", the sweet which literally in Bengali means one who steals the heart till date continues to be a favourite among sweet lovers. Unlike other sweetmeats, the genesis of this fascinating sweet remains unknown still one of the legends associated with Monohora biography is that one of the Moiras ( a caste group associated with sweetmeat business; nowadays it is referred to confectioners) from Moira para (neighbourhood of the Moiras) was entrusted by a member of the royal family of Janai to prepare a sweetmeat. The zamindar left for some work and returned behind his scheduled arrival. The Moira was worried that the sandesh would go bad. He coated a lump of Sandesh in a thick sugar syrup so that the sandesh would not go bad. When the zamindar returned, he tasted the sweet and remarked that the sweet has stolen his heart and hence the name Monohora ( in Bengali it literally implies "je mon ke horon korechche"- one who has stolen my heart).

== Maharaja Kaliprasad Mukhopadhayay ==
In 1834, Maharaja Kaliprasad Mukhopadhayay, a Dewan of the East India Company build the Janai Palace near the bank of Saraswati River, on a cremation ground along with a gigantic "Thakur Dalaan" with seven arches and representing Indo-Catholic architecture, aimed for Durga Puja offerings and henceforth started the most magnificent Durga Puja of the village. On one side of the palace there still exists two temples dedicated in the name of Lord Shiva. Maharaja Kaliprasad Mukhopadhayay earned his reputation in the society by propagating and participating in nationwide religious activities. Kaliprasad was married to Smt. Pitambari Devi of Hoogly and had three sons: Durga Charan, Abhaya Charan, Gouri Charan.

== Descendants of Maharaja Kaliprasad Mukhopadhayay ==
1. Late Shri Durga Charan Mukhopadhyay

Late Shri Durga Charan Mukhopadhyay died at a very early age leaving behind his beautiful wife Tripura Sundari Devi and two sons Purna Chandra and Atul Chandra (Advocate by profession and also patronized "Bengal Drama Society" and founded "Social Improvement Society" in 1868 where several respected European and Bengali socialites joined for the upliftment of Bengali art and culture).

2. Late Babu Purna Chandra Mukhopadhyay

The Elder son of Durga Charan Mukhopadhyay joined as an advocate General under Peter Paul. Later he established the "Mukherjee & Dev" solicitor firm with Raja Shailendra Kishore Dev of Sova Bazar. Innovation of scientific method of blue cultivation by introduction of steam plough was first done by this man who was a first class Freemason. Later he was appointed as the Honorary magistrate of Calcutta and Sealdah Police Court and as the first Indian Chief Justice of Supreme Court of India. He was the first person in Bengal to initiate the Bengali Cultural theaters when theaters in eastern region of the country was not much in vogue. Patronizing Bengali Cultural theaters in 1857, he established a Drama Workshop in his own residence at Janai and dramatised "Shakuntala" and Dina Bandhu Mitra's "Nabin Tapaswini" was the first time ever in the History Of Bengal.Considering his interest in Spiritualism he formed the "United Association of Spiritualist" along with Pyari Chand Mitra, Dwijendra Nath Tagore and several British Patrons.

3. Late Babu Bhutnath Mukherjee

When the elder son of Purna Chandra Mukhopadhyay, Haripada Mukhopadhayay, who was an expert in homeopathy, left at the age of 54 (being invalid from the age of 16) the entire family responsibilities was entrusted upon Bhutnath Mukherjee, who was a specialist in agriculture and forestry. He established a garden House called "Hawa Khana" for conducting research for improved productivity of agricultural crops and farming. He was the mentor of Zamindar Sabha aimed for the improvement of his territory and well being of his Prajas (subjects). His only son, Late Babu Sambhunath Mukherjee, was a poet and singer. He was a sole proprietor of Sri-Sakti press, one of the renowned press of eastern India in his times, and published the first ever Bengali magazine for women, "Ananya". He was married to Late Smt. Gayatri Devi, from the royal family of Hemnagar, Mymensingh (now in Bangladesh).

Sambhunath and Gayatri left five sons: Somnath, Sundarnath, Suronath, Satinath and Sibapada as successors along with two daughters Sree and Indrani who were married to other renowned families of West Bengal. The 7th Generation of Maharaja Kaliprasad Mukherjee comprises 4 sons Subhendu, Sougata, Sohan, Samrat and three daughters—Suvosree, Surosree and Debasree altogether.

Kalibabur Bari's Durga Puja at Janai is one of the oldest pujas in West Bengal. The specialty of the puja can be mentioned as Aparajita puja and Beranjali on the day of Dashami. This puja of a renowned aristocratic zamindar family formerly started at the reign of East India Company. The former zamindar Ishwar Kaliprasad Mukhopadhyay who initiated the puja was the diwan of East India Company. From that time till today the puja is continuing its grandeur and pomp.

== Citations ==
- Sashtri, S.N.(1935) 'The Family History of Bengal', Hoogly & Howrah, Din Granthakar, Vol 2(1), p119.
- Mitra, S.K. (1968) 'Hoogly Jelar Itihash O Banga Samaj', Mitrani Prakashan, Vol.3(1), p1256.
- Kalibabur Bari (2014), Available online at: http://kalibaburbari.wix.com/kalibaburbari
- Durga Puja Online (2013), available online at: http://www.durgapujaonline.com/2010/10/kalibabur-bari-at-janai.html
- Bose, K (2021), 'Family Durga Puja's of Janai and Baksha', available online: https://kinjalbose.com/2021/10/12/family-durga-pujas-in-janai-and-baksha/
- Bengal's Rural heritage homes (2022), available online: https://timesofindia.indiatimes.com/city/kolkata/bengals-rural-heritage-homes-set-to-welcome-back-puja-tourists/articleshow/94427284.cms
- Bonedi Family| Bonedi Barir Durga Puja (2023), available online: https://www.durgautsav.com/photo/bonedi-family/
