= Theatre of Bangladesh =

Theatre in Bangladesh is believed to have its origin in the 4th century AD in the form of Sanskrit drama. The conquest of Bengal by the Gupta Empire led the ingress of the northern Indian culture into the ancient Bangladeshi culture which eventually introduced the tradition of theatre in Bangladesh. At present, apart from the Sanskrit theatre, the influence of the European theatre and the indigenous folk culture can also be seen in the theatre art of Bangladesh.

== Sanskrit theatre ==
Through the conquest of Bengal by the Guptas, the culture of ancient Bangladesh assimilated the Aryan culture of the northern India and got heavily influenced by it. At that time, theatre activities, which was in form of Sanskrit theatre, was generally practised by the urban folks. The vigorous trade by the local people led to the rise of some urban areas which were home to the art and cultural centre of ancient Bangladesh. Lokananda is believed to be a popular play from this period which was structured in four acts with a prologue and was written by Chandragomin.

The close political integration of many parts of ancient Bangladesh with the Aryan culture carried on through the 8th century. During this period, emperors like Bhaskaravarman, Yashovarman, Lalitaditya greatly influenced the Sanskrit theatre movement in the region. However, the theatre activities in this period witnessed the greatest patronage by Harshavardhana. According to the Kashmiri poet Kalhana, there was a great theatre dancer named Kamala in the ancient kingdom of Pundravardhana, now a part of northern Bangladesh. During the Pala rule (8th to 12th century), Bikrampur was the centre of a thriving Sanskrit theatre tradition in Bangladesh. This development of Sanskrit theatre also flourished during the Sena rule.

The tradition of Sanskrit theatre witnessed a major impediment through the arrival of Muslim rule in the early 13th century. Few theatre activities are recorded from this period which were mostly supported by some Hindu feudal lords. Raja Lakshmana Manikya of Bhulua was a great patron of Sanskrit theatre of this period.

== Folk theatre ==
The term Folk theatre encompasses all forms of theatre which originated in the geographical region of Bangladesh. Unlike the Sanskrit theatre, the folk theatre was always in direct contact with the people and was often created and supported by them. However, it was not closed to the refined techniques of the Sanskrit theatre. In the folk theatre, the performers include actors, dancers, singers, musicians, and puppeteers (both male and female). Their performance is not restricted to dialogue in prose but is comprehensive and wide-ranging. It includes any one or more of the following elements: (i) dance, (ii) instrumental music and (iii) speech rendered in prose, verse or lyric, either in the form of narration or that of dialogue. The folk theatre of Bangladesh has developed in distinct forms, which can be loosely categorised into (i) the Narrative, (ii) the Song-and-Dance, (iii) the Processional, and (iv) the Supra-personae.

=== Narrative forms ===
In the narrative forms of theatre, the lead-narrator (gayen) describes an event, portrays various characters related to the event and enacts the action, all in the third person. While engaged as described above, s/he partly speaks his/her lines in prose, partly recites in verse, and partly sings his/her story. S/he is assisted by the choral singers-cum-musicians (dohars), who employ musical instruments (Mridanga and Mandira) and sing choral passages. The gayen carries a chamar (whisk) in religious performances and occasionally dances while singing. Usually, the performer makes effective use of vocal inflections and physical gestures in his/her portrayal of the characters. Sometimes s/he also readjusts his/her basic costume, and uses a few props to make the portrayal more effective.

=== Song-and-dance forms ===
A song-and-dance performance (nata-gita) is characterised by dances rendered by performers enacting characters while singing their lines or dancing silently to songs sung by a group of choral singers and musicians.

=== Supra-personae forms ===
The masked dance of the Gombhira festival was originally an ancient shamanist or spirit cult performance of the Koch community. By the 9th century, the Tantric Buddhism in Bangladesh assimilated the performance to evolve their own forms of masked dance, which were similar to Astamatrika Dance, Mahakali Pyayakhan, Devi Pyayakhan (Kathmandu, Nepal) and Tibetan Buddhist masked dances. These dances were performed in the Buddhist monasteries during religious festivals, very much as in Tibetan and Nepalese practice. These performances were given at the year-ending celebration of Chaitra Sangkranti and were given after processional performances.

By the end of the 12th century, when Tantric Saivism in Bangladesh had assimilated decaying Tantric Buddhism, Buddhist masked dances were also adapted to give rise to Mahakali Pyayakhan, Devi Pyayakhan and similar dances. Tantric Saivite masked dances in Bangladesh, unlike those of Kathmandu Valley (Nepal), decayed because of Muslim conquest. What remains today can be seen in Mukho Nacha, Kali Kach, Gambhira festival and Sang Jatra.

=== Performance with scroll painting ===
The existence of patuya sangit (performances with scroll paintings) in ancient Bangladesh is confirmed by two sources: Yamapattika as referred to in Harshacharita (7th century AD) and scroll painting of the Santals. Banabhatta (the court-poet of Harsavardhan) in his Harshacharita briefly describes a popular performance of Yamapattaka witnessed by Harsavardhan on his way back to the capital after he learnt of the death of his brother. It was given by a performer with the help of a scroll-painting showing Yama, the King of the Underworld. On the other hand, recent ethnographic studies have shown that the Santal people have among them a type of scroll painting representing the origin of life (Ko Reyak Katha) and the passage of the dead from the mortal world to the life beyond (Chaksudan Pat). These too point to the ancient origin of Patuya Gan performances in Bangladesh. In the medieval period, scroll painting performances eulogising Ramachandra, Krishna, Manasa, Chandi were extremely popular. By the 18th century, scroll-painting performances gained popularity even among the Muslims, as evinced by Gazir Pat (scroll-painting performances eulogising Pir Gazi), which can still be seen in Bangladesh today.

=== Puppet theatre ===
It is not known when puppet theatre was introduced in Bangladesh. The earliest extant literary evidence of the existence of the form in Bangladesh is a couplet in Yusuf Zulekha (1391–1410). As signified there, these performances were given with the help of string puppets. It is possible that orally composed tales of gods and goddesses, such as those of Krishna, Rama, Manasa etc., were produced in these performances. Mukunda Chakravarti's Chandimangal (1555–56) and Krishnadasa Kaviraja's Chaitanya Charitamrita (c 1560–80) definitely point to the existence of puppet theatre during this period. Judging by the popularity of cults and the existing tradition among current performers, it could be safely assumed that these were related to Krishna, Rama, Manasa, Chandi and Chaitanya. No Islamic narrative ever seems to have been performed by puppets in Bangladesh. String puppets still exist in Bangladesh today.

=== Processional Forms ===
Processional performances are characterised by the use of tableaux, music, song and dance, all of which form a part of large processions (jatra) attended by adherents of a particular religious faith. In many ways, these performances hold the key to the history of indigenous theatre because they brought together all three types discussed above, to give birth to jatra, the most popular form of the indigenous theatre which can claim to be indeed the national theatre idiom.

== European influence ==
Political and economic measures undertaken by the English colonisers from 1757 onwards led to the Bengali Renaissance in the early 19th century, which affected all aspects of intellectual pursuits in Bangladesh. Its immediate effect was a bifurcation of society into the rural and urban cultures. The elitist urban culture and the European theatre of the economically powerful minority fashioned itself around European models. It demonstrated tremendous vitality, opened new directions, but, as in most cases, also lost touch with the majority and their rural culture. The indigenous theatre, which in most cases remained a part of the rural culture, has failed to meet the demands of the 21st century life in Bangladesh and a process of fossilisation has already set in. On the other hand, the European theatre has been dynamic because the elite urban intelligentsia, who have been responding to the needs of urban spectators, have sustained it. Inception of the European theatre in Bangladesh or erstwhile East Bengal took place in 1855 with a performance of Svarna Sharnkhal by Durgadas Kar at Barisal.

== Theatre during East Pakistan period ==
Until 1947, the theatre of the urban elite in Bengal was centred in Calcutta, the economic and political seat of power of 19th century India. With the creation of Pakistan, Dhaka gained importance as the urban cultural centre of eastern Bengal which later turned into East Pakistan. The theatre of the new country was slowly but decisively moving towards polarisation of two opposing camps: (i) the religion-based nationalists and (ii) the language-based nationalists. The religion-based trend was dominant in the urban areas outside Dhaka. It sought to glorify Islamic history through historical plays on Muslim rulers of the Middle East, India and Bengal, and the independence struggle of Pakistan. Akbaruddin, Ibrahim Khan and Ibrahim Khalil are some of the most prominent playwrights of this trend. The second trend was dominant mainly in Dhaka city and playwrights belonging to this trend were also linked with Dhaka University-based play productions. This trend was pioneered by Natyaguru Nurul Momen. He wrote, published, directed, enacted, broadcast and staged the earliest couple of plays which were secular, non-communal, progressive and international in their themes and plots. The Natyaguru, Nurul Momen's first play 'Rupantor'(Transformation) was a 1942 play which propounded the cause of women's lib and empowerment at a time when even the western world wasn't vocal enough about equal rights for women. Some other important playwrights who followed Natyaguru Nurul Momen in this trend include Shawkat Osman, Askar Ibne Shaikh, Jasimuddin and Munier Chowdhury.

== Theatre in post independence period ==
Theatre was possibly the most forceful and exuberant expression of post-liberation Bangladesh. Numerous non-professional theatre groups were formed all over the country, modelled after the group theatre movement in post-Nabanna Calcutta. The most important among these in Dhaka city were Theatre (established February 1972), Nagarik Natya Sampraday (established 1968, first performance August 1972), Natyachakra (established August 1972), Aranyak Natyadal (established 1972), Dhaka Theatre (established July 1973) and, in Chittagong, Theatre '73 (established 1973), ‘’Tirjak Nattyagoshthi’’ (Established May 1974) and Arindam (established September 1974). The range of texts performed by the groups varied widely, from Euro-American plays to contemporary originals written by group members themselves. A completely new set of playwrights appeared, important among whom were Abdullah al Mamun, Mamunur Rashid, Syed Shamsul Huq, Selim Al Deen, Mumtazuddin Ahmed, Rabiul Alam, S M Solaiman, Abdullahel Mahmud, Mannan Heera, Malay Bhowmick, Azad Abul Kalam and Saymon Zakaria.

The first-ever Bangladesh International Theatre Festival was held at Dhaka’s Shilpakala Academy in June 2019, featuring a host of local works, along with plays from six other countries.

== Significance ==
The culture of theatre has great significance in the history as well as the daily lives of Bangladeshis. The theatre performances had vehemently inspired the independence movements during the British rule in Bangladesh. It also had great impact in the Bengali language movement. The language-based nationalists during the East Pakistan period played an important role in this regard. Kabar written by Munier Chowdhury is a famous play based on the language movement. The theatre performances also significantly influenced the independence struggle of Bangladesh. At present, many NGOs use theatre as a forceful medium to create awareness for many social issues in the rural areas of Bangladesh.

== Bibliography ==
- Bharucha, Rustam (1993). Rehearsals for Revolution: The Political Theatre of Bengal. Honolulu: University of Hawaii. pp. 254. ISBN 9780824808457.
- Al-Deen, Selim (1996). Madhyajuger Bangla Natya. Dhaka: Bangla Academy. p. 528.
- Ahmed, Syed Jamil (2000). Achinpakhi Infinity: Indigenous Theatre of Bangladesh. Dhaka: University Press Ltd. p. 396. ISBN 9840514628.
