= Gopalpur Upazila =

Gopalpur Upazila গোপালপুর
- Upazila
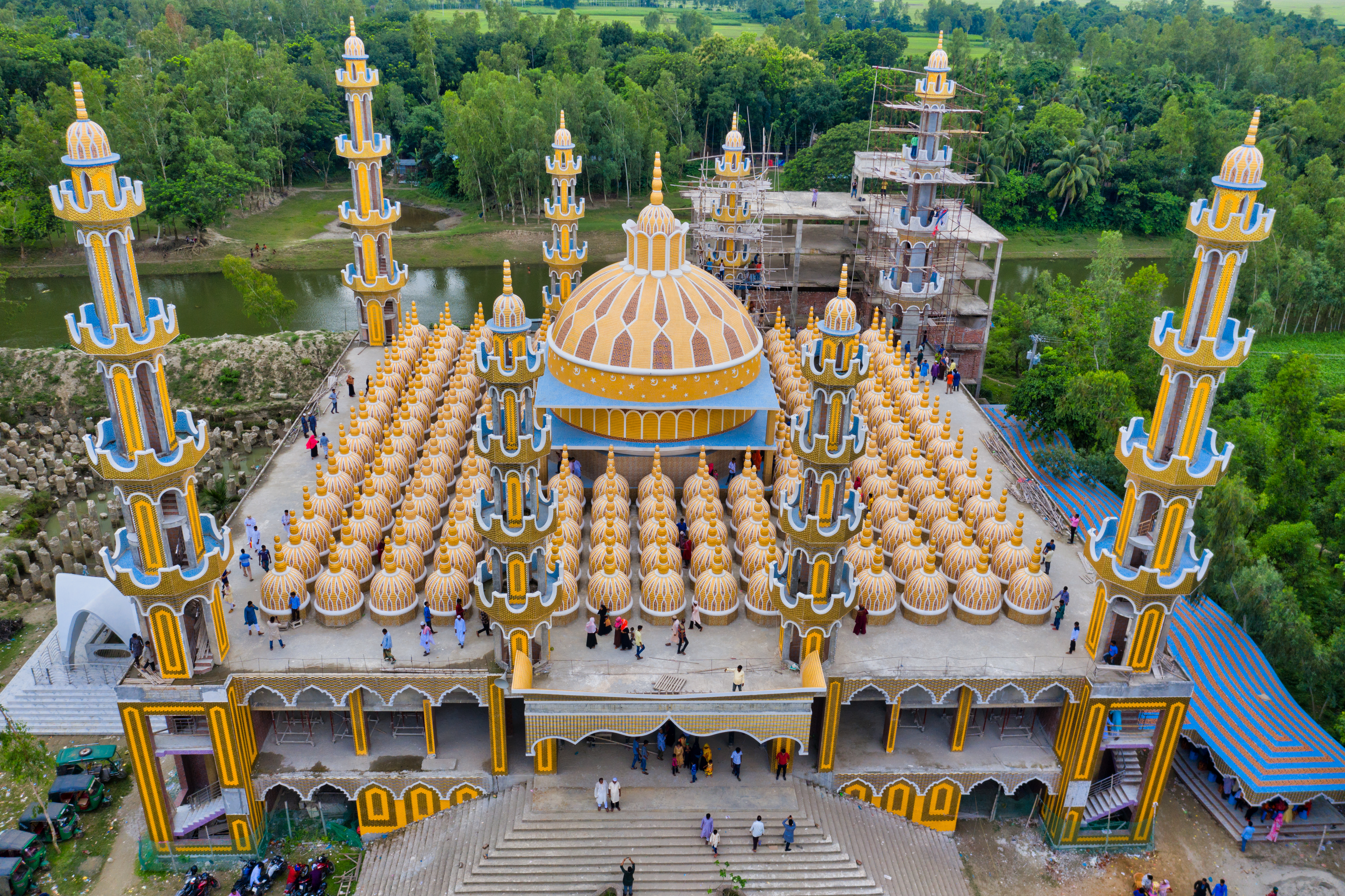
- 201 Dome Mosque

- Coordinates: 24°33.5′N 89°55′E
- Country: Bangladesh
- Division: Dhaka
- District: Tangail

Area
  - Total: 193.37 km^{2} (74.66 sq mi)

Population (2022)
  - Total: 270,333
  - Density: 1,398.0/km^{2} (3,620.8/sq mi)
- Time zone: UTC+6 (BST)
- Postal code: 1990
- Area code: 09226
- Website: gopalpur.tangail.gov.bd

Gopalpur (Bengali: গোপালপুর) is an upazila of Tangail District in the Division of Dhaka, Bangladesh.

Gopalpur Upazila mauza geocode map

== Geography ==
Gopalpur is located at 24.5583°N 89.9167°E. It has a total area of 193.37 km^{2}.

== Demographics ==
Historical population
Year	Pop. (000)	±%
1981	205	—
1991	253	+23.4%
2001	274	+8.3%
2011	263	−4.0%
2022	270	+2.7%
Source: Bangladesh Bureau of Statistics

Religions in Gopalpur Upazila (2022)
Religion	Percent
Islam	96.44%
Hinduism	3.55%
Other or not stated	0.01%

According to the 2022 Bangladeshi census, Gopalpur Upazila had 74,177 households and a population of 270,333. 8.62% of the population were under 5 years of age. Gopalpur had a literacy rate (age 7 and over) of 66.10%: 68.18% for males and 64.17% for females, and a sex ratio of 93.90 males for every 100 females. 67,378 (24.92%) lived in urban areas.

According to the 2011 Census of Bangladesh, Gopalpur Upazila had 63,976 households and a population of 252,331. 54,069 (21.43%) were under 10 years of age. Gopalpur had a literacy rate (age 7 and over) of 45.70%, compared to the national average of 51.8%, and a sex ratio of 1043 females per 1000 males. 50,160 (19.88%) lived in urban areas.

== Administration ==
Gopalpur Upazila is divided into Gopalpur Municipality and seven union parishads: Alamnagar, Dhopakandi, Hadira, Hemnagar, Jhawail, Mirzapur, and Nagda Simla. The union parishads are subdivided into 111 mauzas and 158 villages.

Gopalpur Municipality is subdivided into 9 wards and 35 mahallas.

== See also ==
- Gopalpur
- Upazilas of Bangladesh
- Districts of Bangladesh
- Divisions of Bangladesh
