= Bangladeshi martial arts =

Bangladesh is home to various traditional martial arts, of which Boli Khela and Lathi Khela are popular and historically significant. Other martial arts are mainly hybrids.

== History ==
The genesis of Bangladeshi martial arts has been attributed to the need for protect villagers for Zamindar. During British period, lathial groups were sent to forcibly collect taxes from villagers. The farmers and youth people also made their lathial group to defend the zamindars lathial group. In the char (shoal) lands, people still take possession of chars through stick fights.

== Butthan ==
Butthan is a Bangladeshi martial art and an approved combat sport included by the National Sports Council (NSC) under Ministry of Youth & Sports, Bangladesh. Butthan was founded by Superhuman Mak Yuree Vajramunee. It is a system of self-defense and personal development rooted in South Asian heritage. As a combat sport, the martial art is practiced in different parts of the world under the International Butthan Federation. It aims to transform the human body through balance of physical, mental, emotional and spiritual spheres and thereby attaining self-mastery and beyond. Butthan characterizes 'Co-competition' system to depict the non-aggressive, cooperation-based path of empowerment.

== Lathi Khela ==
Lathi khela is a traditional martial art of Bangladesh that emphasize weapon-based fighting with sticks and other weapons. Lathi made by bamboo and other materials. Lathi khela teaches self-defense with sticks. One who specialized himself in wielding lathi and who lived on the martial art came to be known as lathial. The Lathial Bahini (group of lathials) performed various acts on the Eid or Puja occasion. Lathi Khela have a remarkable history but the popularity is on the wane now.

== Boli Khela ==
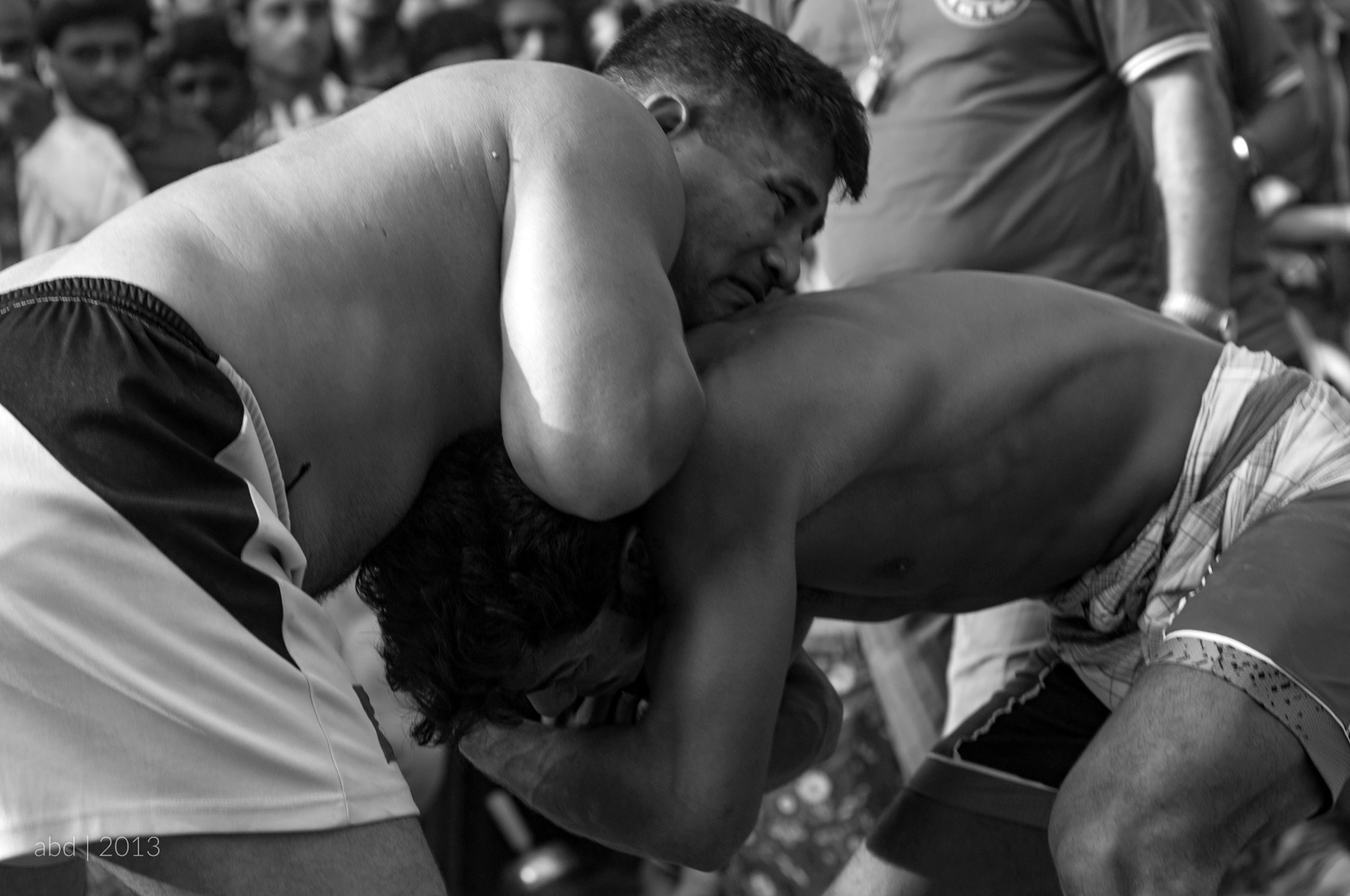
A scene from Jabbarer Boli Khela (The man in the picture is named "Didar boli", the undefeated champion Boli wrestler of Bangladesh)

Boli Khela is a traditional form of wrestling in Bangladesh which includes grappling-type techniques such as clinch fighting, throws and takedowns, joint locks, pins and other grappling holds. Abdul Jabbar who was a renowned businessman in Chittagong introduced the wrestling competition in the year 1899 to organize the youths against the British rule. Since then the event has been organized every year in Lal Dighi Moidan at Chittagong. Every year new participants get a chance to participate in this traditional wrestling. Wrestlers of all ages visit Lal Dighi Moidan to participate in the game. Fans of many countries come here to see Boli Khela.
