= Gopalpur, Tangail =

Gopalpur গোপালপুর
- Town
- Location within Bangladesh
- Coordinates: 24.5583°N 89.9167°E
- Country: Bangladesh
- Division: Dhaka Division
- District: Tangail District
- Upazila: Gopalpur Upazila
- Incorporated: 1974

Government
  - Type: Pourashava
  - Mayor: Md. Rokibul Haque Sana (Bangladesh Awami League)

Area
  - Total: 23.12 km^{2} (8.93 sq mi)

Population
  - Total: 50,160
  - Density: 2,170/km^{2} (5,600/sq mi)
- Time zone: UTC+6 (BST)
- Postal codes: 1990
- Area code: 9226
- Website: gopalpur.tangail.gov.bd

Gopalpur (Bengali:গোপালপুর) is a town of Gopalpur Upazila, Tangail, Bangladesh. The town is situated 44 km north of Tangail city and 127 km northwest of Dhaka city, the capital of Bangladesh. The town consists of 9 wards and 35 Mahallas.

== Demographics ==
According to Population Census 2011 performed by Bangladesh Bureau of Statistics, The total population of Gopalpur town is 50,160. There are 12539 households in total.

== Education ==
The literacy rate of Gopalpur town is 49.5% (Male-51.7%, Female-47.3%).

== See also ==
- Bhuapur
- Sakhipur
