= Styles of silat =

Silat is a generic name for the martial arts of certain countries in Southeast Asia. There is untold number of Silat systems in Maritime Southeast Asia, with there being over 150 recognized styles of pencak silat in Indonesia, and more in aboard.

Most Silat styles can be roughly categorized into Pencak Silat (from the Indonesian Archipelago especially Java) and Silat Melayu (from Malay Peninsula and Sumatra).

== Pencak Silat ==
=== Minangkabau ===
- Silat Harimau

=== Java ===
- Tapak Suci
- Inti Ombak
- Perisai Diri

=== Betawi ===
- Cingkrik
- Beksi
- Kwitang
- Sabeni

=== Bali ===
- Bakti Negara

=== Other ===
- Tunggal Hati Seminari

== Silat Melayu ==
=== Malaysia ===
- Seni Gayong
- Seni Gayung Fatani
- Lian Padukan

=== Thailand ===
- Silat Pattani
