= Weapons of pencak silat =

Aspect of the Indonesian martial art

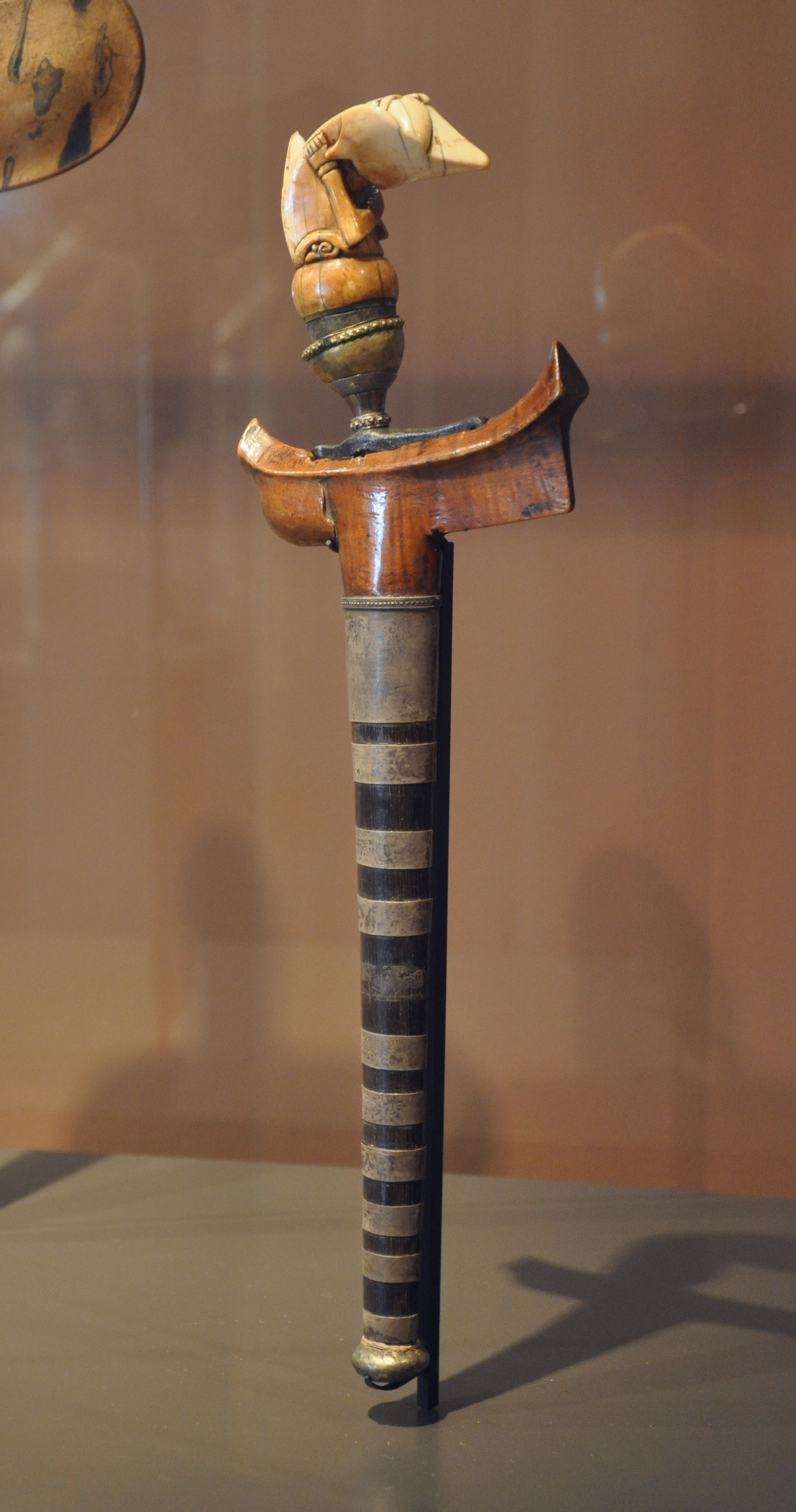
A Minang kris

Listed here are the weapons of pencak silat. The most common are the machete, staff, kris, sickle, spear, and kerambit. Because Southeast Asian society was traditionally based around agriculture, many of these weapons were originally farming tools.

== Bladed weapons ==
Parang / Golok

A chopper or cleaver originating from Sumatra and Java which, like a machete, is used to cut through overgrowth. They may be curved or straight and range in size from small handheld knives to the length of a sword. They often have curved handles that extend to protect part of the hand, but not always. Because they are so widely available, parang are one of the most popular weapons in silat. A variant of the parang is the golok, which is one of the main weapons in West Javanese styles. The golok blade is heaviest in the centre and ranges in length from 10 to 20 in (250 to 510 mm).

Sabit / Celurit

A sickle originally employed when harvesting crops. It may be paired and was historically one of the most popular weapons among commoners. It was and still is the main weapon of silat exponents from Madura in East Java where it is known as arit. The arit has several forms and is typically longer than in other parts of Java. The sickle is difficult to defend against and is considered particularly effective when paired with a knife. It can be wielded on its own but is also commonly paired. They tend to have thicker blades than other sickles.

Kerambit / Kuku Macan

The kerambit (kurambik in the Minangkabau language) is a narrow-bladed curved weapon resembling the claw of big cats. It is known in some dialects as kuku macan or "tiger claw". The kerambit is held by inserting the first finger into the hole in the handle, so that the blade curves from the bottom of the fist. Although usually wielded singly they may also be paired. Not only are they difficult to disarm, the kerambit is also easily hidden on account of its compact size. This concealability was the main reason for the weapon's fame. The kerambit was often regarded as a lady's weapon because women would tie them into their hair.

Pisau / Churiga

Pisau refers to a short-bladed knife of any shape, although it can also be used to mean sword. It comes from the Chinese term bishou or pengsau and is used in some form in every style of silat. The wooden sheaths of most edged weapons can be used for blocking, parrying or striking.

Keris

The kris or keris is a type of dagger, often with a pistol-gripped handle. Traditionally worn as a status symbol and carried by warriors for when they lost their main weapon in battle, today it is the main weapon of many silat styles in Indonesia. The kris is characterised by its distinctive wavy blade, but originally most of them were straight. The blade is given its characteristic shape by folding different types of metal together and then washing it in acid. Keris were said to be infused with venom during their forging but the method of doing this was a closely guarded secret among blacksmiths. The kris is usually wielded on its own but it can also be paired.

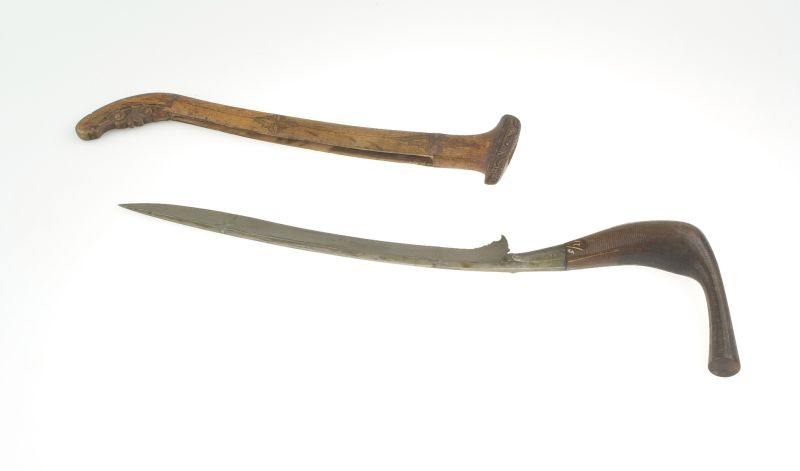
Rencong with wooden scabbard

Rencong

The rencong or renchong is a pistol-gripped knife from Aceh. The blade is straight but with a slight curve. In terms of social stature, the rencong in Aceh is comparable to the kris in Malay and Javanese culture.

Tumbok Lada

The tumbuk lada (or tumbuak lado in the Minangkabau language) is a Minang blade from West Sumatra. Literally meaning "pepper crusher", it is similar to the Acehnese rencong except that the handle is not bent and is traditionally adorned with a parrot head figure. The blade is thick, flat, and double-edged. The tumbuk lada is sometimes called a lading but this term properly refers to a knife made from an old spearhead. Both weapons have blades ranging from 8 to 16 in (200 to 410 mm).

Badik

The badik or badek is a small, straight knife originating among the Makasar and Bugis people. They may be double or single-edged and range in length from twenty to forty centimetres.

Kujang

Kujang

A curved blade originating in West Java, it is a characteristic weapon of the Sunda styles of silat. It is considered to be of spiritual significance by the Sundanese people and is even featured on the West Javan flag.

Pedang

Pedang is a general term for sword but occasionally refers to a scythe as well. According to the Sanghyang siksakanda ng karesian canto XVII dated 1518, the sword and kris were the main weapons of the kesatria caste. Southeast Asian swords can differ considerably from one community to another but they are generally made for one-handed use. Varieties include the pedang jenawi or longsword, the gedubang or Acehnese sabre, and the long-handled dap. The Indian-style sword was used in the region as early as the 4th century, as can be seen in bas-reliefs of Javanese temples. Some are straight while others have a "bent" curve. The Hindu goddesses Durga and Manjusri are typically depicted carrying swords in Javanese art. Sumatran broadswords are based on those of China. Swords on the Malay Peninsula are usually one-edged with a slight curve, resembling the Burmese dha and the Thai sword used in krabi-krabong.

Klewang

The kelewang or klewang is a single-edge Indonesian longsword, usually worn without a sheathe. Blades range from 15 to 30 in (380 to 760 mm) in length and may be straight or slightly curved.

Sundang

The sundang is a sword created by the Bugis people of Sulawesi. As with the kris, the sundang usually features a wavy blade, but straight-bladed specimens also exist.

Sakin

The sakin or sokin is a slender thrusting knife with a straight blade. A related weapon, the sewar, has the same appearance except that the blade is curved. In 1800, the traveller Charles Campbell wrote that the inhabitants around Mount Kerinci and Siak Sri Indrapura all carried sewar at their sides. Both the sakin and sewar were the preferred weapons of Minang assassins.

Chipan / Jipan

The chipan (also spelled cipan or jipan) is a battle-axe, the weaponised form of the domestic kapak (axe) or beliong (hatchet). Two are sometimes wielded at once, with one in each hand. While the kapak and beliong were originally designed for cutting wood or chopping down trees, they could be improvised as chipan if needed.

Kapak Siam

Kapak Siam literally means "Siamese axe". Its shape is that of a small axe with a sharp curved handle. Created in the Pattani province of Thailand, the weapon is said to have originally been used for cutting open betel nuts. Unique to the Pattani-Kelantan region between Malaysia and Thailand, the kapak Siam is primarily a throwing weapon and only used in close as a last resort. The handle is often attached to a string so it can be pulled back after being thrown.

== Blunt weapons ==
Tongkat

Tongkat literally means walking stick. In silat, it refers to any short stick or club. It is mostly interchangeable with the words toyak, gada, belantan or tembong. Sticks are also commonly called kayu which literally means wood. Depending on its shape, the handle of a tongkat may be used to sweep an opponent or catch their weapon. The techniques used with the stick could also be applied to similar objects for the purpose of self-defense. Most notable among these is the seruling or flute played during silat demonstrations as well as other cultural performances. The short stick is often wielded in pairs (tongkat ganda).

Cakeram / Gelang besi

The cakeram is a steel disc which can be either thrown from a distance or wielded in close like the Chinese wind and fire wheels. Originally from India, the cakeram may be flat and sharp-edged or torus-like. The latter form is typically paired and referred to as "steel wheels" (gelang besi).

Topang

Topang literally means crutch. Traditional crutches in Southeast Asia were made up of a stick with a perpendicular handle attached about one third of the length down. The weaponized form is shorter, measuring only the length of a forearm. Traditionally made from bamboo or wood, they may also be constructed from steel. The most common form of the topang is the pancawangan sakti which is made of bamboo and has a 5 in (130 mm) blade protruding from inside the shaft. Originating in northern Malaysia where it is most prevalent, several versions of the weapon exist. What is believed to be the earliest form consists of a rectangular slab of wood strapped to the fighter's forearm with rope, combined with a handle. Unlike its current form which is usually paired, this weapon was used defensively like a shield, and was typically used either on its own or with a sword. A modern variant known as the segu is entirely metal. The version used by law enforcement officers is called kayu-T, literally meaning "T-stick".

== Flail weapons ==
Cambuk / Pecut

A whip or riding crop. They may be made from rattan, bamboo, plant fibers, animal hide or leather.

Sauku / Ekor pari

The sauku is a type of whip. This form of whip may also be called ekor pari, literally meaning stingray's tail, but this often refers specifically to the cat o' nine tails. The sauku was carried by wrapping it around the waist underneath the sarong.

Liangcat

Literally meaning "double-stick", the liangcat consists of a pair of sticks connected by a short chain or occasionally rope. The sticks are traditionally made of wood but some versions may be constructed from steel. Said to have been based on an indigenous Southeast Asian rice flail, the liangcat in its weaponized form is generally believed to be a Chinese innovation. The primary offensive technique is the swing, although thrusts with the handles are also possible. Grips and locks may be used to immobilise or disarm the opponent. The liangcat is generally used on its own so that it can be switched from hand to hand, but it is sometimes wielded in pairs.

Rantai

The rantai is a chain which can be swung offensively or used to lock and seize opponents. It can sometimes be substituted with a length of rope (tali). A common variant is the rantai batangan, literally meaning "stick chain". Originating in China, it consists of several metal rods links together by iron rings. The ends are weighted, each weigh about 2 oz (57 g). One end has a dart used for piercing. Chain whip techniques in silat are the same as the staff, centrifugal force keeping the weapon straight.

== Long weapons ==
Toya

A staff, pole or rod. Silat exponents regard it as the most versatile of all weapons. They are typically made of rattan, but some are made from bamboo or steel. Staves can also be referred to as tiang or kayu. The word galah refers to the pole used for knocking fruit down from trees or when punting a boat. Another term pedagang (literally meaning trader or merchant) refers to the carrying pole. The pedagang is traditionally made from ruyung, a type of palm wood. The best pedagang are said to come from the Mentawai Islands Regency where the wood is soaked in coconut oil for three years. Staves are usually 5–6 ft (1.5–1.8 m) in length and 1.5–2 in (38–51 mm) in diameter. A longstaff is called galah panjang.

Tombak / Lembing

The tombak is a spear while the lembing is a javelin. Both terms are often used interchangeably but tombak actually refers to non-missile weapons which are circular at the base of the blade, rather than spatulate. Lembing can be used for either a spear or javelin. Early spears were made entirely of wood. The steel-tipped spear was one of the main weapons used by soldiers in Southeast Asia, along with the kris, sword and shield. The spear usually has horse-hair attached near the blade. Contrary to the western misconception that it is used to distract opponents, the horse-hair's true purpose is to prevent the enemy's blood from dripping onto the handle. Tombak can vary considerably in length and come in a wide range of blade shapes, often of Chinese derivation.

Trisula

A trident, the weaponised form of the serampang or three-pronged fishing-spear. A related weapon is the lembing tikam pari or three-barbed spear. Asian mythology links the trident with the supernatural, so it is sometimes called tongkat sakti or magic staff. The word trisula is sometimes also used when referring to the tekpi or short-handled trident

Geranggang / Seligi

A primitive spear or javelin constructed from a sharpened stick of bamboo. The difference between the terms is that seligi refers to the dart or spear intended for throwing. Sumatrans would make short lances from nibong or sago-wood. Over a period of days or weeks, the sharpened end would be buried in ashes, steamed, smoked and charred. The finished weapon could be thrown or used hand-to-hand, and was said to be able to pierce armour more efficiently than iron.

Arbir

The arbir is a type of glaive measuring about 5 ft (1.5 m) in length. On one end is a single-edged curved blade, while the butt end is spiked. A shallow groove runs along the length of the shaft, in the plane of the blade. The purpose of this groove is to let the wielder know at a touch where the cutting edge of the weapon is located without having to look at the blade.

Kaoliam

A hook-spear, sometimes known as golok chakok. The latter term refers to a hooked staff or billhook, originally used as a boat hook. Similar to the Chinese dichotomy between the spear and broadsword, the kaoliam in silat acts as the counter to the golok. A related weapon is the angkusa or elephant-goad measuring 2–3 ft (0.61–0.91 m) long with a tip of steel or bronze. Southeast Asian royals and generals would ride elephants either into war or during processions. Every elephant was guarded by one to four handlers, each of whom carried an angkusa.

Tembiang

A pole weapon comparable to the European pike.

== Melee weapons ==
Chabang / Tekpi

Literally meaning "branch", the chabang is an iron truncheon with three prongs. Called chabang in Indonesian and tekpi in Malay, it is generally believed to have been based on the Indian trisula. Chabang are traditionally paired and used defensively. The two outer prongs are used for trapping the weapon or breaking the opponent's weapon. Among silat practitioners, the chabang is known as the king of weapons because of its usefulness when defending against blades.

Kipas

The kipas is a folding fan usually made of bamboo, while more combat-worthy fans are constructed from harder wood or iron. Although created in China (where it is known as tieshan), the fan is common to many Asian cultures, as can be seen in traditional Indonesian-Malay dances. As a weapon the fan should be able to open and close easily with one hand, particularly if two are being wielded at once.

Perisai / Jebang

The perisai is a shield, typically paired with a spear or javelin. Shields in silat are generally round bucklers made of rattan. However, the indigenous tribes of Malaysia and Indonesia commonly wield the jebang, a long hexagonal wooden shield. The Indian dhal (shield) made of steel is used in some parts of the west coast, particularly Aceh.

Chaping

The chaping (called caping in Indonesian and terendak in Malay) is a conical hat often worn by farmers, travellers and others who spend long hours exposed to direct sunlight. In some Indonesian silat forms, the hat is used as a self-defense implement for blocking attacks. It can also be thrown at the opponent as a distraction.

Payung/Payong

The payung is a traditional umbrella or parasol. Carried for protection from the rain and strong sun, it was a common weapon of self-defense. Umbrella attacks are primarily thrusts with the tip, as any swings with the side of the weapon would be cushioned. In close-quarters, the handle can be used for striking. The umbrella can be used to parry or opened up in front of the opponent, blocking their view of the wielder.

Samping / Chindai

The samping is a wearable sarong usually tied around the waist or draped across one shoulder. Related weapons include the linso or kerchief, and the chindai or Sindhi waist-sash made of silk. Students first use it for practicing hand movements but in advanced stages it is applied as a weapon. Samping techniques include locks, grabs and choke-holds. It can also be used to trap the opponent's weapon or attacking limb. The samping is particularly useful against bladed weapons since the wrapped cloth provides some protection from cuts. In many styles, the chindai or samping is among the last weapons taught.

== Range weapons ==
Gandewa

The gandewa is a bow though it is more often referred to as a busar or busur today. The word originates from Gandiva, the legendary bow used by Arjuna of the Hikayat Pandawa Lima. It was a common hunting weapon even among the region's aboriginal tribes (orang asal), but was later replaced by the senapang or rifle. The bow is very rarely taught in modern silat schools.

Sumpitan

The sumpitan is a blowpipe, a hollow bamboo tube through which poisonous darts (damak) are shot. It is one of the oldest weapons in the region, having been used as a hunting tool by Proto-Malays since prehistoric times. The blowpipe is also the most popular long-range weapon in silat and was most often used to kill someone unawares. It typically measures 1.8 m (5 ft 11 in) long and is made from two pieces of bamboo, one for the barrel and one for the casing. In close combat, it could be wielded as a stick. In Malaysia, the orang asli (indigenous tribes) are considered the greatest masters of the blowpipe. Tribes such as the Iban of Sarawak used a hollow spear which could shoot arrows, thus combining the characteristics of a projectile and hand-to-hand weapon.

Paku

Literally meaning spike or nail, the paku is a shuriken-like throwing dart, based on the Chinese piau or biu. Early forms were 2–3 in (51–76 mm) long and pointed at both ends. Its small size and double point were intended to make the weapon more difficult for the victim to see or avoid. The newer design is 4–6 in (100–150 mm) long and only pointed at one end, making it much easier to throw. The paku is a hidden weapon, kept concealed in the hand or the garments until ready to be used. It was traditionally only taught to advanced students.

== Imported weapons ==
Kiam

Kiam is the Hokkien word for the Chinese jian or jien, a straight double-edge sword. It is one of the oldest known weapons to have been adopted from outside Southeast Asia, and is depicted on bas-reliefs in Srivijaya dating back more than one thousand years. Because it is lightweight and easily broken, the jian is hardly ever used for blocking. Instead, the fighter must rely on agility to dodge and avoid attacks. In silat, the Chinese sword can be used singly or in a pair.

== See also ==
- Silat
- Pencak silat
- Silat Harimau
- Silat Melayu
- Kuntao
- Indonesian martial arts
- Indonesian art
