= Luohan Ru Yi Quan =

Shaolin martial art

Luohan Ru Yi Quan [ Hanyu Pinyin ]: literally ‘Luohan “As You Wish” Fist’. This set altogether has 108 different hand techniques, and includes the Dazun 9 Yang Gong, Wuji Gong, Taiji Gong, and Wuxing Quan. A rare and secret high-level Shaolin martial art. It should not be confused with the much better known Eighteen Luóhàn [or Arhat ] Boxing System.

The system is also known by the names, ‘Printing the Red Palm [Push attack],’ and ‘The Old Man Set’ (an informal name for the system known within the Chee Kim Thong Nan Shaolin lineage). Its origins are not known, but can be ascribed to an early period of the Shaolin Temple's martial arts history. As with all of the Shaolin martial arts, and in particular the highest level ones such as Wujiquan, it has a spiritual meditation development purpose separate to its martial applications. In comparison to the predominantly ‘yin’ characteristics of Wujiquan, Luohan Ru Yi Quan is more robustly ‘yang’ in its fundamental dynamics and visual impact. It is known as ‘The Old Man Set,’ ‘As You Wish Fist,’ and ‘Printing The Red Palm,’ because it contains mastery of techniques which only the most gifted Shaolin gong fu masters and traditional Shaolin fighting monks of old attained after a lifetime of patient study and exceptional success in fighting application. With this level of gong fu reached, the Luohan Ru Yi System enabled its practitioners to use techniques, to ‘push through’ any form of attack, and defeat or kill the challenger.
