= Anuar Abdul Wahab =

Malaysian silat practitioner

- Born: Anuar bin Abd. Wahab; 23 December 1945; Bagan Tunjang, Sabak Bernam in Selangor, Malaysia
- Died: 10 March 2009 (aged 63); Hospital Kajang, Kajang Selangor, Malaysia
- Other names: Cikgu Anuar
- Occupation: Grandmaster of PSGFM
- Known for: Master of silat
- Title: Tuan, Pendita
- Website: Grandmaster at Seni Gayung Fatani PCS

Notes
- Was awarded the title Ahli Mangku Negara which carries the title (suffix) AMN

Anuar bin Abdul Wahab AMN was a grandmaster of Seni Gayung Fatani who, during his time, revolutionized the teaching and practice of silat in Malaysia.

== Biography ==
He was born on 23 December 1945 in Bagan Tunjang, Sabak Bernam, Selangor. He received an early education at Sekolah Melayu Sabak Bernam and Sekolah Ungku Aziz Sabak Bernam, respectively, located in Selangor and Sekolah Alam Shah, Kuala Lumpur.

From 1957, he embarked on a comprehensive study of various Silat styles, including Silat Harimau, Silat Cekak, Silat Kuntau Betawi, and Seni Silat Helang Sewah, all in Kampung Kota Hutan Melintang within the Perak state. Notably, he learned these styles from different family members.

Tuan Haji Anuar died on 10 March 2009, at the Kajang Hospital in Selangor, Malaysia. His death came as a great shock to the silat community, both locally and internationally. Before his passing he completed his last book, entitled "SILAT". He also wrote Silat Melayu (1992) and Silat Olahraga (1987).

Currently, Grandmaster Aminuddin Anuar (his successor) leads the publication of his works. One of the latest book is SILAT: Warisan Bangsa Malaysia (SILAT: The Malaysian Heritage, 2016).

== Qualifications ==
Among his qualifications are:

- Teaching Certificate ETC/PLD [1965-1966] Physical Education/Art
- Diploma in Islamic Studies (1985) UKM B.A.Hons (USM) 1982/M.A (UKM) 1987
- Proficiencies in Physical Education, Art, Literature
- Took courses in
  1. Art (MPIK)
  2. Islamic Da’wah (JPM)
  3. Graphics Animation for Film (IPTAT)
  4. Drug Education

He retired as a teacher in the fields of physical education, art, and literature, and was a staff member at the Selangor KBSM Art Source.

== Involvement in Silat ==
Since 1957, he has studied several silat styles such as Silat Harimau, Silat Cekak, Silat Sendeng, Silat Kuntau Betawi, and Seni Silat Helang Sewah at Kampung Kota Hutan Melintang, Perak from members of his family with the exception of Kuntau Cimande which was not taught to him by members of his family. In 1965, Tn. Hj. Anuar bin Haji Abdul Wahab learned Seni Gayung Fatani in Sabak Bernam, Selangor. The year 1976 marked his foundation of the Pertubuhan Seni Gayung Fatani Malaysia as a Chairman and Grandmaster. In 1983, through the efforts of Tn. Haj. Anuar bin Abdul Wahab PSGFM became a founding member of Persekutuan Silat Kebangsaan Malaysia (PESAKA).

After he died in 2009, the grandmaster position is being left unreplaceable. All the guru-guru from all negeri agreed that his eldest son is not the right candidate as there were no wasiat and the position isn't a family lineage privilege. Until today PSGFM only appointed Guru Kanan or Main representatives from each negeri in Malaysia.

== Involvement in PESAKA ==
Became a member of Dewan Perguruan of Persekutuan Silat Kebangsaan Malaysia (PESAKA) and member of Dewan Perguruan PESAKA Selangor. Tn. Hj. Anuar bin Abdul Wahab founded Silat Olahraga (Silat combat sport) by holding National and State Silat Olahraga Coaches and Referee Jury courses since 1984-2004. He also founded Silat Seni by holding National and State-level Silat Seni Coaches and Referee Jury courses since 1995.He planned and executed the Kursus Muzik Silat Baku Malaysia (and was Judge for Pergendangan Silat (Muzik Silat Baku Malaysia) in Kedah 2002-2004), Kursus Jurulatih dan Hakim Silat Seni Sekolah-sekolah Malaysia which was a course for coaches, referees and jury on the Malaysian school level at Maktab Teknik Kuala Lumpur. He founded, put together and conveyed the Curriculum for Seni Silat Malaysia since 2002 on national, state and organizational levels. Became the Technical Chairman of the World Silat Championships Kuala Lumpur 1987 and Technical Chairman of the 14th SEA Games Kuala Lumpur.

== Developing Silat at School-level ==
Held the position of Technical Chairman of the first National Secondary Schools’ Silat Championship Kuala Lumpur. Held courses for state and national-level Silat Seni judges. He also held silat classes in primary and secondary schools in Malaysian states and engaged himself in school silat programs. Those who were exponents since at school and were trained until they became national athletes have produced gold medals as well as national and international level trainers. He developed Silat at school-level by creating a curriculum for the clear and concise execution of silat education at school level.

== Developing Silat at an International Level ==
He held the position of secretary to the sponsorship of the formation of Persekutuan Silat Antarabangsa (PERSILAT) 1979 in Jakarta, Indonesia. He has also provided training to silat coaches from several nations such as Austria, Switzerland, and France to expand silat in their home countries. Also by aiding and holding seminars and workshops at international level such as in countries like France, Switzerland, Austria, Germany and North Korea. He also choreographed the form of "Jurus Wajib" for the Persekutuan Silat Antarabangsa (PERSILAT) in 1996. Tn. Hj. Anuar bin Haji Abdul Wahab trained the national teams of Thailand and Vietnam and developing the PERSILAT Council of Silat Seni, Beladiri and Silat Olahraga Judges.

== Honour ==
=== Honour of Malaysia ===
- Malaysia : Member of the Order of the Defender of the Realm (A.M.N.) (1993)

== Literary works ==
- Silat Olahraga, “Kuala Lumpur, Dewan Bahasa dan Pustaka 1987”
- Teknik dalam Seni Silat Melayu, “Kuala Lumpur, Dewan Bahasa dan Pustaka”
- Silat Curriculum, Teaching Plans and Silat Evaluation Exams for the Ministry of Culture, Arts and Heritage Malaysia and the Ministry of Education Malaysia with the co-operation of Persekutuan Silat Malaysia (PESAKA).
- "SILAT" which contains elaborations on the Silat Teaching Plan based on the Seni Silat Malaysia Curriculum for the reference of silat coaches and exponents.
