= Silat (disambiguation) =

Silat may refer to:

- Silat, the umbrella term for martial arts in Maritime Southeast Asia
- Pencak Silat, the umbrella term for traditional Indonesian martial arts, also the term used for competitive silat in Maritime Southeast Asia region
  - Silat Harimau, the Minangkabau style of pencak silat originates from West Sumatra, Indonesia
- Silat Melayu, term refer to martial arts from the Malay Peninsula
