= Sabeni =

Betawinese pencak silat style created by Sabeni bin Canam

Silat Sabeni Tenabang Sabeni silat
- Hardness: Full-contact, semi-contact, light-contact
- Country of origin: Indonesia (Tanah Abang district)
- Olympic sport: No

Traditions of Pencak and Silat
- UNESCO Intangible Cultural Heritage
- Country: Indonesia
- Reference: 01391
- Region: Asia and the Pacific

Inscription history
- Inscription: 2019 (14th session)
- List: Representative

Silat Sabeni Tenabang (Sabeni Silat of Tenabang), often shortened as Sabeni silat, is one of the Betawinese pencak silat (Betawi: maen pukulan) styles. The style was created by its eponymous founder Sabeni bin Canam around the end of the 19th century, when Indonesia was still in the Dutch colonial period. It was originally developed in the Tanah Abang district, now part of Central Jakarta, Indonesia.

In 2019, the Sabeni silat was recognized as an intangible cultural heritage of Jakarta, with Registration No.: 201900925.

== History ==
Sabeni bin Canam was born in 1860 in Kebon Pala hamlet of Tanah Abang. He learned silat from Hajji Syuhud and Hajji Ma'il, the Betawinese martial artists who lived in the vicinity of Tanah Abang. He then combined the skills he learned from his two masters, and with their permissions created the Sabeni silat style.

During the Dutch colonial period, Sabeni worked as a public security head (Betawi: serean) at the subdistrict level (Dutch: Onderdistrict). The Sabeni silat school history recorded that Sabeni started to become recognized when he won in a friendly match against a well-known silat champion from Kemayoran district. He then won against several Kuntau masters sent by Dutch landlords to fight him in public fights at Prinsen Park (now Lokasari Park, Mangga Besar); and during the Japanese occupation period, he continued to win against Japanese martial artists in matches organized by the Japanese military administration (Japanese: Gunseikanbu). Sabeni's disciples took part in the physical resistance during the Indonesian struggle for independence.

Sabeni died on August 15, 1945, and his silat style was continued by his descendants and disciples. In 2016, there were at least 6 silat schools or silat communities that taught Sabeni silat style in the Tanah Abang district.

== Forms ==
Some characteristics of the Sabeni silat are close proximity fighting positions, fast and flexible hand movements, and foot strokes aimed at slamming the opponent. The silat moves tend to prioritize attacking and waiting for opportunities to open up the opponent's weaknesses.

The following are the names of the main forms in Sabeni silat (Cing Mus lineage), as follows:

1. Jalan Cara Cina (Chinese Step)
2. Kelabang Nyebrang (Crossing Centipede)
3. Empat Persegi (Four Square)
4. Empat Kelima Pancer (Four Fifth Center)
5. Sela Bumi (Earth's Crack)

Each of the forms has many subforms (kembangan) that can be practised up to hundreds. Some of them are:

- Kotek
- Pulet
- Sikut (Elbow)
- Sangkolan (Hook)
- Pulir (Twist)
- Sendok (Spoon)
- Tubruk Kacip (Crash and Clamp)
- Jalan Kelabang (Centipede Step)
- Kelabang Muter (Rotating Centipede)
- Naga Ngerem (Crouching Dragon)
- Merak Ngigel (Shivering Peacock)

Along with the development of the Sabeni silat, there are slight differences in the naming, sequence, movement, and application of the forms in various schools that teach this style.

== School's lineage ==
H. Syuhud (silat master)	H. Isma'il (silat master)	Habib Alwi Al Habsyi (religious teacher)
Sabeni bin Canam
Non family disciples	Sya'ban (father-in-law)	M. Saleh Sabeni (Sabeni's son & Macan Kemayoran's grandchild)	Mustofa Sabeni (Sabeni's 6th son)	M. Ali Sabeni (Sabeni's 7th son)
Family disciples	Children and other nephews of Cing Mus	Ramdhani Mustofa (Cing Mus' 5th son)	Zul Bachtiar (Aba Ali's 2nd son)

== See also ==
- Indonesian martial arts
- National Intangible Cultural Heritage of Indonesia
- Pencak Silat
- Styles of silat
