= Fatani =

Fatani may refer to:

- Isi Fatani (born 1969), Tongan rugby union player
- Seni Gayung Fatani, martial art
- Patani (historical region) in Thailand
