= Carlito A. Lanada Sr. =

Filipino martial artist

Carlito A. Lanada Sr. (born August 1939) is a Filipino martial artist and a grandmaster of the martial art Kuntaw aka(Kuntao). He is also an author and founder of Kuntaw ng Pilipinas and International Kuntaw Federation.

== Biography ==
Great Grandmaster Carlito A. Lanada Sr. (Lañada in the Philippines) was born in Naga City of the Bicol region of Luzon Island in the Philippines in 1939. He is the son of Esteban "Yong Iban" Lañada and Cresenciana Agregado. Esteban's father, Eugenio Lañada (also known as Yuyong Huenyo) came from the Tausug tribe in the southern Muslim island of Mindanao. He was taught by both his grandfather and his father in the art of kuntaw back in Mindanao and was passed down within the Muslim royal families. His grandfather was one of the sons of Rajah in the Tausug tribe. He decided to find his fortune in the northern Philippines.

After forming his organization of Kung Fu-Karate Organization of the Philippines and formalizing the training of Kuntaw, he went on to train many champions. Kuntaw (meaning "sacred strike' or 'fist way') is the modern version of kuntao in the Philippines as developed, taught, and propagated by the Great Grandmaster Carlito A. Lanada, Sr. which is an eclectic art encompassing hard and soft techniques with elements as well as cat-like movements that show the influence of karate and kung-fu styles, with 43 distinctive forms, 86 basics, and Arnis sticks as its weapon of choice. In 1966 the Great Grandmaster was rewarded by his peers the title of “Youngest Filipino Martial Art Founder”. In 1968 his organization became a founding member of the World Union of Karate-Do Organizations (WUKO), and in 1970 he became one of the founding members of the Philippine Karate Association (PKA). He changed the name of his organization to Maharlika Kuntaw Association, honoring the Filipino Muslim royalties from which Kuntaw originated. In 1974, he changed the name to Kuntaw Ng Pilipinas following his award for work in the Filipino Martial Arts by then President Ferdinand Marcos, thus completing the formalization of Kuntaw as a Filipino national art. Constantly working to perfect his art, he is known to periodically upgrade and realign his forms and instructions across all affiliated schools. Due to this, the training style may differ slightly based on when you learned Kuntaw (although, much of the original forms and methods still remain). This resulted in the development of Kuntaw Lima-Lima, translated as the art of five sacred strikes.

With the closeness to the U.S. Naval Base, he trained many Americans and other foreigners, as well to many Filipinos who migrated to other countries. These Kuntawista's went to countries such as America, Saudi Arabia, Japan, England, Canada, United Arab Emirates, and others to establish schools of their own. In 1979, he held the inauguration of the International Kuntaw Federation (I.K.F.), thereby uniting all members of Kuntaw worldwide. "International Kuntaw Organizes in R.P." Black Belt. Active Interest Media, Inc. July 1980.

To date, the Kuntaw Temple in Olongapo City is being cared for and run by his eldest son, Grandmaster Carlito G. Lanada Jr. The Great Grandmaster Carlito A. Lanada Sr. has moved to the United States with most of his family. Within few years of residing in the United States, he garnered the highest award by being a recipient of the Presidential Sports Award as a Martial Arts Grandmaster in 1993. The Great Grandmaster completed his book “KUNTAW – The Ancient Filipino Martial Arts” ISBN 978-1881116622 in January 1995 and commenced the compilation of an advanced book on Kuntaw.

In 1996, he was inducted into the International Karate Hall of Fame and the Martial Arts Museum of America. In 1997, he founded a new worldwide organization – World Unified Council of Martial Arts (WUCMA), with five other Grandmasters. Kuntaw has come to age, from obscurity to international renown. Grandmaster Lanada is the 2002 Filipino Martial Arts Magazines Who's Who Man of the Year! In 2008, GGM Lanada traveled to Canada, where he was inducted into the North American Martial Arts Hall of Fame. In June 2010, Lanada was inducted into the Masters Hall of Fame in Anaheim, California. There he was also awarded their Highest honor- the Platinum Lifetime Achievement Award. GGM Carlito A. Lanada Sr. is currently residing in North Carolina.

== Honors and achievements ==
- 1966 - Rewarded by his peers the title of “Youngest Filipino Martial Art Founder”.
- 1968 - His organization became a founding member of the World Union of Karate-Do Organizations (WUKO).
- 1970 - Became one of the founding members of the Philippine Karate Association (PKA).
- 1970 - Changed organization's name to Maharlika Kuntaw Association.
- 1974 - Changed the name to Kuntaw Ng Pilipinas following his award for work in the Filipino Martial Arts by then President Ferdinand Marcos, thus completing the formalization of Kuntaw as a Filipino national art.
- 1978 - Personally briefed AMAA members in the arts of Kuntaw, Arnis, and Kali. Assisted the AMAA in opening an active line of contact with the Subic Naval Station and Olongapo, Philippines. Directly aiding the AMAA in the identification of the Philippine (martial) arts. MacArthur, Herbert (December 1979). "Karate in the Philippines a Joint Effort". Black Belt. Active Interest Media, Inc.
- 1979 - Held the inauguration of the International Kuntaw Federation (I.K.F.), thereby uniting all members of Kuntaw worldwide. "International Kuntaw Organizes in R.P." Black Belt. Active Interest Media, Inc. July 1980.
- 1979 - Appeared in the December issues of Black Belt Magazine. MacArthur, Herbert (December 1979). "Karate in the Philippines a Joint Effort". Black Belt. Active Interest Media, Inc.
- 1993 - Recipient of the United States Presidential Sports Award as a Martial Arts Grandmaster.
- 1995 - Completed his book “KUNTAW – The Ancient Filipino Martial Arts” and commenced the compilation of an advanced book on Kuntaw. ISBN 978-1881116622
- 1996 - Inducted into the International Karate Hall of Fame and the Martial Arts Museum of America.
- 2002 - Filipino Martial Arts Magazines Who's Who Man of the Year.
- 2008 - Inducted into the North American Martial Arts Hall of Fame (in Canada).
- 2010 - Inducted into the Masters Hall of Fame in Anaheim, California.Where he was also awarded their Highest honor- the Platinum Lifetime Achievement Award.
