= Kuntao =

Hokkien term for the martial arts of the Chinese community

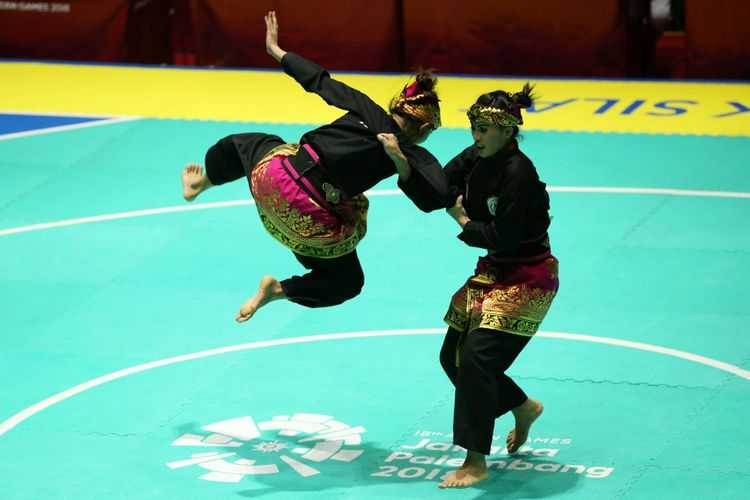
A demonstration in Indonesia

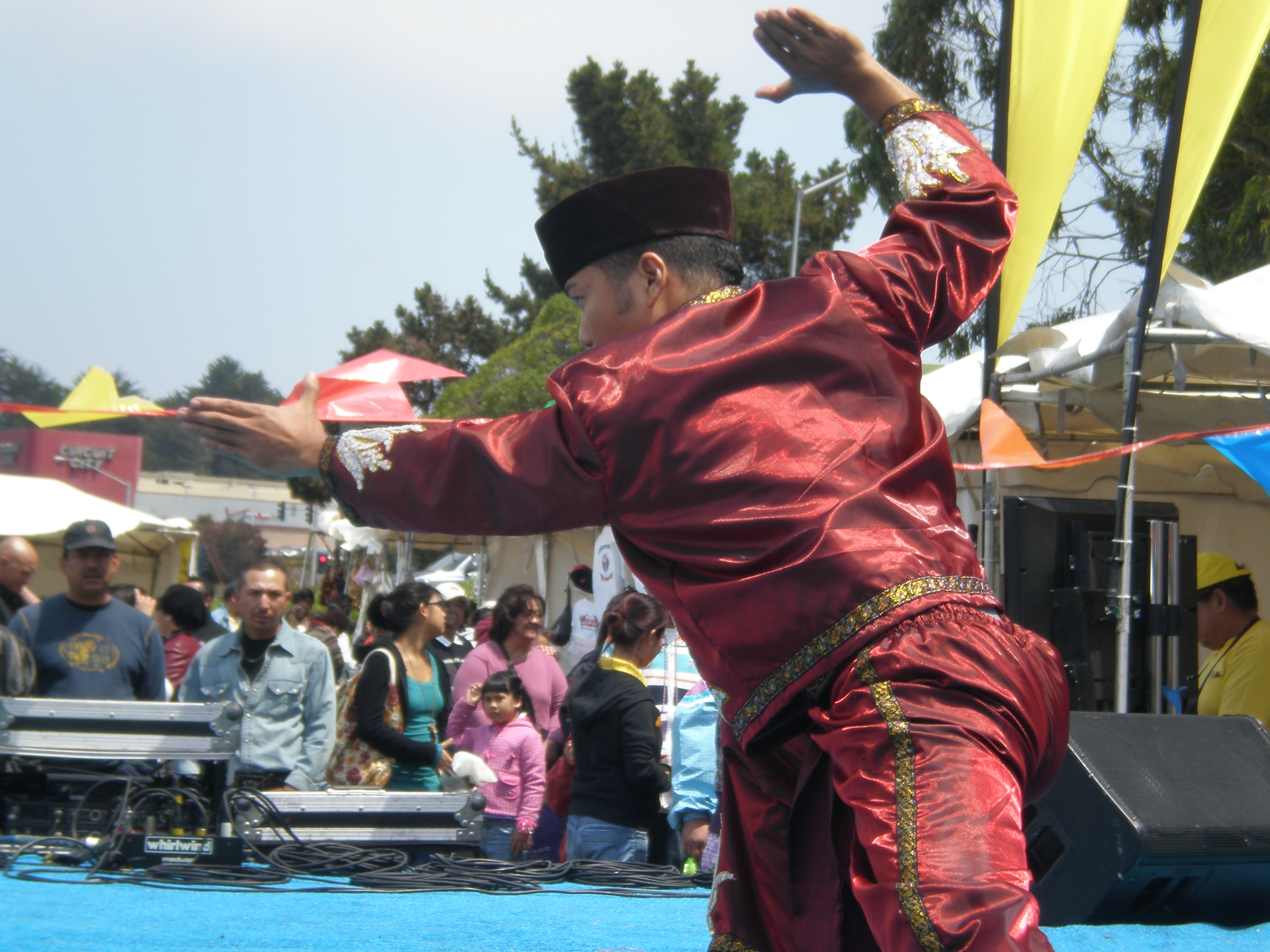
A member of the San Francisco based Parangal Dance Company performing a Langka Kuntao routine as part of their Bangsamoro suite of dances at the 14th Annual Fil-Am Friendship Celebration at Serramonte Center in Daly City, California.

Kuntao
Written Chinese	拳道
Bopomofo:	ㄑㄩㄢㄉㄠ
Pinyin	Quándào
Pe̍h-ōe-jī	Kûn-thâu
Indonesian	Kuntao
Malay	Kuntau
Filipino	Kuntaw

Kuntao or kuntau (Chinese: 拳道; pinyin: quándào; Pe̍h-ōe-jī: kûn-thâu, Tagalog: kuntaw) is a Hokkien term for the martial arts of the Chinese community of Southeast Asia, specifically the Malay Archipelago. It is most commonly practiced in and associated with Indonesia, Malaysia, the Philippines and Singapore.

== Etymology ==
There are no standard hanzi for kuntao, but the most common reading is "way of the fist", from kun 拳 meaning fist and tao 道 meaning way. Less common readings may use the character kun 棍 meaning staff, or tou 头 meaning head, so that it could be translated as "way of the staff" or roughly "knowledge of fists". In Fujian and other southern areas, this term was originally used for Chinese martial arts in general and was synonymous with quanfa (拳法, Pe̍h-ōe-jī: kûn-hoat). The word is recorded in Classical Malay and Indonesian, making it the oldest known term for Chinese martial arts in those languages, before the modern adoption of the term kungfu. In English, and even in its modern Chinese usage, kuntao usually refers specifically to styles brought to Southeast Asia and often does not include other Chinese fighting systems.

== History ==
The presence of Chinese martial arts in the Malay Archipelago traces back to ancient contact between China and Southeast Asia. Donn F. Draeger goes as far as to call them the oldest major organised system of fighting in Indonesia, pre-dating the structured teaching of silat. The Toraja, Batak, and Dayak cultures all show Chinese influence, and Chinese weapons are often depicted in ancient Sumatran art. Some pre-colonial Chinese temples in Indonesia display combative images characteristic of southern Chinese forms, and many techniques and weapons of silat are of Chinese and Indian influence. Many Peranakan families can still trace their clan history in the region as far back as the voyages of Admiral Zheng He, but most Southeast Asian Chinese were brought to the Malay Archipelago as working-class immigrants during the colonial era. In Indonesia in particular, every Chinese community had some form of kuntao, but were traditionally shrouded in secrecy. As recently as the 1970s, kuntao was often practiced secretly to avoid its techniques from being revealed to outsiders, both Chinese and non-Chinese. It was not openly displayed, and public demonstrations would hide the true forms. This changed during the latter of the 20th century, and kuntao is now taught commonly without secrecy. Kuntao was introduced to the US by Martial Artist and Military Veteran Joe Rossi, who learned it from his Filipino Master in World War II. He was taught the martial art as a member of the special forces in the US Navy to apply in Combat operations. Rossi began teaching Kuntao at his private studio in Waterbury, Connecticut after the war. It popularized further, by Willem Reeders and Willem de Thouars in the 1960s.

== Styles ==
Both northern and southern Chinese martial arts are represented in kuntao, but the majority of systems originate from the same southern states as the Southeast Asian Chinese communities who practice them. Fujian, Shandong, Kongfu, and Guangdong styles dominate. Some systems were directly imported from China and underwent little or no changes, such as Pakua (baguazhang) and Peh-ho (Fujian White Crane). Among the most common of these are Saolim (Shaolinquan), Ngochokun (wuzuquan or Five Ancestors fist), and Thaikek (tai chi). Other styles may be a conglomeration of several different schools resulting from the supposition that they had to adapt to the Southeast Asian weapons and environment. The sanchian form is a common fundamental to all major styles of kuntao.

Kuntao in Jakarta is predominantly of Fujian extraction, characterized by their frontal and right stances (right foot advanced). All Fujian stances are based on observations of not just animals but also humans, such as a newborn baby or a drunken man. Unlike the low stances of other systems, Fujian forms primarily switch between the ting and pa stance, both of which are designed to feel natural with normally-spaced placement of the feet and legs. Shandong styles - practiced across Java and Madura - are Saolim derivatives, identified by their positioning of the thumb atop the clenched fist, as well as their left stances. Their techniques include high kicks, rolling, leaping, and both short and long arm movements. Styles of Kongfu origin (not to be confused with the misunderstood term "kung fu") are known for their rigidity and static postures. Guangdong styles are fast and energetic, employing flailing arm motions, subtle hand movements, and semiclenched formations for parrying and blocking.

In Malaysia, the word kuntao is currently most common in Sarawak but the art itself is widely practiced throughout the country. Both the internal and external systems are well-represented. Most are of Hokkien, Cantonese, Hakka, or Yunnan origin (the latter known in Malay as Lian Yunan). Among the oldest are southern Saolim and the three major internal schools (neijia), all of which strongly influenced local silat. Luohanquan (Arhat fist) and Thaikek dominate. The Chuga Siulam (Chu family Shaolin or phoenix-eye fist) school of Penang is the lineage-holder of the discipline and traces directly back to the art's founders. Wengchun (Wing Chun) has become increasingly popular since the early 20th century. Five Ancestors Fist is practiced mainly in the south and is known locally as Gochoh. It is the most pervasive style of kuntao in Singapore and the Philippines, though Thaikek is also commonly practiced. Singapore is known for both Hainanese styles as well as Cantonese Hunggakun, particularly the Tiger And Crane form.

Kuntao in Sarawak (spelled locally as kuntau) was disseminated by Sino-Iban and adopted by the wider Iban people. Masters are addressed as guro and the training area is an outdoor space called kelang. Kuntau remains guarded by secrecy today, seldom shown to the public and rarely taught outside the community. Though traditionally passed within the family, kuntau has dwindled in popularity among the young. There are currently only 24 kelang statewide and 14 styles remain. This includes Lang Nginau, Tepis Memaloh, and Sinding Ujan Panas. The styles known as Spring 12 and Spring 24 closely resemble Wing Chun. As with Lian Padukan, they trace back to a Chinese man from Yunnan. In 2017 the National Iban Kuntau Association (Nika) was formed to preserve Iban kuntau, and has approved selected patterns to be displayed to the public.

Kuntao in the Philippines is spelled as kuntaw. Some styles usually trace their lineage to a Buddhist monk named Darmon (based on the Bodhidharma legend) who fled China for Indonesia during the 13th century Mongol invasion. Ngochokun (wuzuquan) and Pakuazen (baguazhang) are prominent while Thaikek (taijiquan) is mainly practiced as a health exercise. Both kuntaw and silat additionally exist as a dance-like Filipino (or exclusively Muslim Mindanao peoples for clarity's sake) performance art, while the combative aspect was passed down privately from parent to child. A notable example of this was Carlito A. Lanada, Sr. who inherited the art of Kuntaw Lima Lima. He is the son of Yong Iban Lanada, whose father, Yuyong Huenyo came from the Tausug tribe in the southern Muslim island of Mindanao.

== Integrated systems ==
Millennia of mutual exchange has at times blurred the line between kuntao and silat. Some schools may use the terms almost interchangeably as in Bali. Others incorporate both words in their name, as with Silat Kuntau Tekpi. In the most extreme cases, a particular lineage is passed down within the indigenous Southeast Asian community until it loses any outward Chinese reference. This has sometimes been intentional, particularly after the Chinese Communist Revolution. Between 1949 and the mid-80s, some schools were rebranded as silat to distance themselves from Maoist China. Additionally, the establishment of Indonesia's silat governing body IPSI in 1948 was a motivating factor for martial arts schools to be recognized by the association if they're considered silat. The rise of racism in more recent decades has further resulted in alterations to oral traditions and histories, de-emphasising their inception as the product of Chinese culture. The following are examples of such revision. All are characteristically Chinese in their techniques, tactics, and medicinal practices.

=== Cingkrik ===
From the Betawi word jingkrik meaning agile, legend traces Cingkrik to a monkey style of kuntao created by a woman who based the techniques on a group of monkeys she witnessed fighting. In the early 1900s this kuntao eventually reached a man in Rawa Belong named Kong Maing who further developed it after a monkey stole his walking stick and evaded all his attempts at retrieval. The modern revision credits Kong Maing entirely, ignoring its kuntao background.

=== Beksi ===
Beksi was created in the 1800s by a Tionghoa Peranakan named Lie Cheng Hok, who took both Chinese and native Indonesians as disciples. His successor was a Betawi and it has been passed down in Tangerang ever since. According to the revision, Lie Cheng Hok himself was a student of a mysterious cave-dwelling hermit named Ki Jidan, who is now widely considered the progenitor.

=== Kwitang ===
Unlike most recent revisions, the dispute over Mustika Kwitang has existed for several decades. All agree that it began with a sparring match between a Tionghoa martial artist named Kwee Tang Kiam and a (traditionally unnamed) Betawi herbalist in the 17th century. The loser would become the winner's student, but who won is a topic of contention. Some say Kwee Tang Kiam was the logical victor as the style still carries his name. Others say he lost and married the local man's daughter. As the art was passed down within the family, they continued to use the Kwitang name.

=== Bangau Putih ===
A white crane system founded in Bogor, West Java by Subur Rahardja in 1952. As a young child Subur Rahardja learned martial arts from several teachers, as well as his father and other family members. He was the acknowledged inheritor of five masters from different lineages. Most notably among these was his paternal uncle Liem Kim Bouw, other teachers included Mpe Sutur, the founder of the Cimande Pencak Silat school, Asuk Yak Long, and Gusti Djelantik. https://www.silat.de/flashback_of_pgb_en.html Current website: https://pgbbangauputih.or.id/

=== Lian Yunan ===
A family of about 22 styles centered mainly in Johor, Malaysia. They are remarkably similar to Wing Chun with which they share a common origin in Yunnan, China during the 1700s. The most prominent style is Lian Padukan, itself a derivative of Buah Pukul from the Mersing district of Johor. It is said to have been introduced by a Hui man who made a name for himself fighting in the docklands of 1920s Singapore and Johor. Confusion over the Hui identity has led to revisionists replacing the founder's Chinese heritage with an Arab one.

=== Kuntaw ===
Its arrival in the Philippines is unclear for even among the Mindanao people there is no research dedicated to tracing the lineage or the importer of the martial art or when was the first recorded reference of this martial art, and if there is, a question of authenticity arises. The same could be said of silat practiced culturally in the southernmost parts of the archipelago. It is safe to say, that is until a new paper is published about retracing its history in the islands, that this fighting method only started to "come out" in the country in the mid-20th century. It is written as kuntaw in the Philippines, the Chinese origin of kuntao is rarely denied, but it has often become associated with the Filipino Muslim usually among Maguindanaons, Maranaos and Tausugs but it is also associated with the Filipino Muslim community of Indonesian or Borneo descent, given that the southern Filipinos are more culturally linked to Malays than those Filipinos from Luzon and Visayas. The term is sometimes mistakenly translated as "sacred strike" from kunsagrado hataw.

== Weapons ==
The vast array of weaponry found in China is naturally reflected in kuntao, the most famous examples being the sword, sabre, staff, spear and butterfly swords. Listed below are some of the weapons used in traditional styles of kuntao. Pronunciation and spelling vary according to dialect and transliteration system used. The Mandarin word-forms are given in parentheses.

- Kiam (jian): straight double-edge sword
- Tou (dao): any single-edge blade, usually referring to the sabre
- Toya (gun): pole, usually of either wood or iron
- Chio (qiang): spear, often with horsehair attached near the blade to prevent blood from dripping to the shaft
- Taichiu: short-handled trident
- Kwan-tou (Guan dao): pole glaive named after Guan Yu of Romance of the Three Kingdoms fame
- Hongkiam-kek (ji): crescent-moon spear
- Hwa-kek: a polearm resembling the ji but with two crescent blades, one on each side of the spear-head
- Sangkau (shuanggou): hook swords
- Sanh-chat (sanjie-gun): staff divided into three sections of equal length and joined together by chain
- Liang-chat (liangjie-gun): chained stick divided into two sections, either one long and one short or a diminutive version in which both are of the same length
- Kwai (guai): crutch-like truncheon, usually paired
- Suk piao (sheng biao): rope with a metal dart attached to one end

== See also ==
- Silat
- Chinese martial arts
- Filipino martial arts
- Kenpo
- Liu Seong Kuntao
- Kun Khmer
