= Wujiquan =

Chinese martial art

Wujiquan (Chinese "無極拳"; Pinyin "Wujiquan"; Wade-Giles "Wu Chi Chuan"), known as the "Ultimate Void Boxing" or "A Rare and Secret Ultimate Void Boxing Skill" and "Mother Art of Tai Chi," is a Chinese martial art. It is a traditional system composed of 36 "Characters" divided into 18 kinds of natural climatic phenomena and 18 of Qi applications.

One of the rarest of traditional Shaolin kung fu systems, wujiquan is also one of the purest of traditional Chinese soft-internal boxing systems (neijia): being taught to very few in its entirety and only after years of rigorous training and testing for aptitude; it never became widely known, which meant that unlike the better known tai chi, there was no opportunity for the system to undergo the experimentation and mixing with other systems and arts which during recent centuries led to the variety of styles which characterize tai chi.

Wujiquan is an ancient system known in the Three Kingdoms age of the renowned legendary Chinese physician, Hua Tuo (c 208), and with origins reputedly much older (2,000 BCE). As its name and the names of its individual 36 Characters indicate, it is derived from ancient Chinese, Daoist and pre-Daoist (shamanic ancient Chinese) concepts such as Yin-Yang, and also from natural climatic phenomena. The name of its creator(s) is unknown, but it is understood to have been originally taught at and included amongst the ancient systems taught at the Shaolin Temple (Songshan, Henan Province, China) from its early centuries until at least as late as the Second Sino-Japanese War.

The authority for the assertion of the ancient origins and teaching within the original historical Shaolin Temple System from very early times is derived from one of the last Abbots of the Putian, Nan Pu Tuo (also formerly known as ‘Quanlin Yuan’), Southern Shaolin Temple (Fujian Province). The Abbot of this historic temple, the Very Reverend Yik Cha’an Cha’an Sze taught this system (and Luohan Ru Yi Quan, and 18 Arhat Boxing) over the course of 3 years to his disciple, Chee Kim Thong prior to the fall of the temple and invasion of Fujian by the Japanese – Chee gave the system the nickname of ‘Shaolin Tai-Ji’.

Another form of Wujiquan is said to originate from Zhang Sanfeng. It is said that after he created tai chi, Zhang Sanfeng created wujiquan. This form of wujiquan is passed down by Shouyu Liang in Vancouver.

Articles about wujiquan have also been provided in the Chee Kim Thong Pugilistic and Health Society Yearbooks of 1979, 1976, and in much more recent times about primordial qigong by a renowned qigong specialist.
