= Chee Kim Thong =

Chinese martial artist

Chee Kim Thong (Chinese: 徐金棟; pinyin: Xú Jīndòng; 1920–2001) was a Shaolin martial arts grandmaster.

Chee was born on 19 May 1920 in a village near Putian, Fujian, China. The son of You Yuan, a Fujianese merchant, Grandmaster Chee Kim Thong's apprenticeship to Chinese martial arts began as a child. His natural ability, combined with a family tradition of excelling in the martial arts – his grandmother was a recognised master of Monkey Boxing (Hou Quan) - prepared him well for the traditional Lei Tai contests. He won many titles in these provincial tournaments.

== Lineage ==
Grandmaster Chee Kim Thong acknowledged four masters, although a fifth included, Ye Neo (sister of his Wuzuquan Master, Great :Grandmaster Lin Xian):

- Great Grandmaster Toh Yit Choon:
His first master, Head of the Household Guard of Dr Sun Yat Sen (First president of the Republic of China), and responsible for teaching Grandmaster Chee Northern Shaolin styles and systems.

- Great Grandmaster Lin Xian [Lim Hian]:
Grandmaster Chee’s Five Ancestor Fist (Wuzuquan) System’s teacher.

- Great Grandmaster Yang Yue [Yong Yuek]: A friend of Grandmaster Chee’s grandfather, he taught him Wu Mei Style gong fu, and the Wuxing Zhang (Five Element) System.

- The Very Reverend Yik Cha’an Chan Sze:
Former Abbot of the Southern Shaolin Temple, Putian, Fujian province. He invited the young Chee Kim Thong to personally learn some of the rarest, secret Shaolin martial arts systems. Last and greatest of Grandmaster Chee’s teachers, he taught him extensively in the rarer and most ancient Shaolin arts, including the Eighteen Arhat Boxing System, and in particular the entire Wujiquan and :Luohan Ru Yi Quan systems.

By the time he completed his studies under the former Abbot, the Second Sino-Japanese War had engulfed Fujian: due to his renown as an exceptional pugilist, Grandmaster Chee played an important part in fighting against the Japanese invaders, becoming the leader of the patriot guerrilla force known as The Big Knife Army. Eventually forced to flee mainland China, he took refuge in Malaysia and Singapore, where he was for a time a captive of the invasion forces. But Chee managed to escape and remained in hiding until the Japanese forces capitulated.

After the conflict, Grandmaster Chee Kim Thong deliberately concealed his identity and his martial arts background. He became increasingly known in Malaysia for his work as a very successful healer and bone-setter: bone-setting was one of the medical skills that authentic traditional Chinese martial arts that masters of his generation possessed.

Grandmaster Chee's martial arts prowess was publicly revealed when, whilst working as a bus conductor, he defended the bus driver from a mob of angry villagers wielding parangs (a type of sword) whilst unarmed. His reputation soon spread until Mr Yap Cheng Hai of Singapore (who would become Grandmaster Chee's first disciple) travelled to meet him and implored him to resume his teaching of the martial arts.

When he eventually came out of his self-imposed retirement, he divided his time between his business. He trained others in the martial arts of his renowned lineage, and worked extensively as a nationally renowned doctor of Traditional Chinese Medicine, conducting surgeries in various locations across Malaysia.

Chee undertook various charitable works, which included contributing towards the reconstruction of the Southern Shaolin Temple at Putian, Fujian. His international educational work to assist the preservation and teaching of the arts of his famous lineage formed a particularly important activity during the latter years of his life; he was accorded the title of ‘Living National Treasure of the People’s Republic of China’ in 1989.

A staunch defender of the traditional concept that ancient arts and systems should not be altered, he taught the perspective that traditional Shaolin boxing is first and foremost a method of training and developing character and spiritual development.

In 1995, Grandmaster Chee Kim Thong was awarded the honorific title of ‘dato/datuk’ [Malaysian equivalent of the English ‘knighthood’] as an acknowledgment of his exceptional medical expertise in the field of Traditional Chinese Medicine. It was for this reason that his name came to the attention of the Sultan of Terrengganu, whom he personally assisted to regain good health after illness.

Grandmaster Chee Kim Thong died on 12 April 2001, leaving a legacy that endures internationally through the traditional teachings he passed to his disciples and many students.

He realised that in modern times his disciples would not have the background of the traditional Shaolin training. So he decided that to teach each of his disciples a style that was best suited to the individual's character and ability, in order to develop the individual style bestowed by him on them. In this way he was able to pass on and protect the arts of his lineage collectively through his disciples rather than any sole individual as traditionally would have been the case in earlier times.

In the different circumstances of contemporary Chinese martial arts in the early 21st Century, Grandmaster Chee Kim Thong was, almost a decade after his death, recognized as a 10th dan practitioner at the International Shaolin Wuzuquan Federation Conference in February 2010. His martial arts legacy is succeeded by, amongst others, his sixth son, James Chee. (徐文成).

Videos featuring Grandmaster Chee Kim Thong can be seen on qi-tube.com

In teaching Wuzuquan, Master Chee taught (at least) the following forms:

1. 三戰 - Sānzhàn (plus Tail, Catching, and Two-Man set)
2. 二十拳 - Èr Shí Quán (plus Tail, Catching, and Two-Man set)
3. 挑切 - Tiǎo Qiē (plus Tail and Catching)
4. 左戰 - Zuǒ Zhàn (plus Catching)
5. 打角 - Dǎ Jiǎo (plus Catching)
6. 雙綏 - Shuāng Suí
7. 鼓吹鞭 - Gǔ Chuí Biān
8. 式節 - Shì Jié
9. 沉頭 - Chén Tóu
10. 清風 - Qīng Fēng
11. 鶴拿手 - Hè Ná Shǒu
12. 大三戰 - Dà Sānzhàn
13. 地煞 - Dì Shā
14. 六合擂法 - Liù Hé Léi Fǎ
