= Bambu runcing =

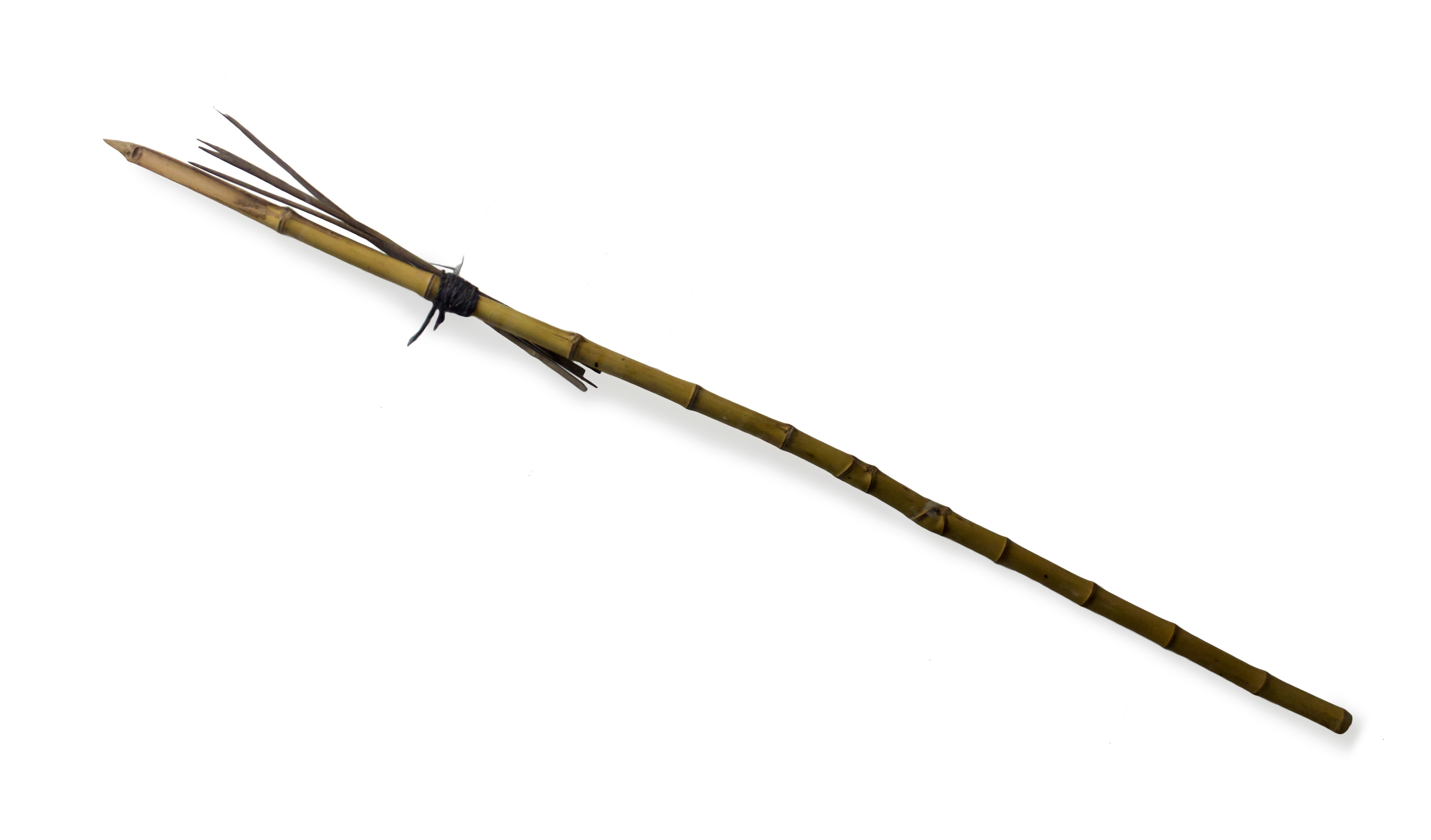
- A bambu runcing as used by some Indonesian revolutionaries. Held at the Monumen Jogja Kembali.
- Type: Spear
- Place of origin: Java, Indonesia

Service history
- Used by: Javanese
- Wars: Indonesian National Revolution

Specifications
- Length: 2 m (6 ft 7 in) approximately
- Hilt type: Bamboo

A bambu runcing or prìng lancìp (which literally means "Spiked Bamboo") is a traditional spear made of a sharpened bamboo.

== History ==
During the Majapahit kingdom in the 15th century, bambu runcing fighting was practiced on the island of Java. The fights were performed in front of the king and queen in an open field. Both parties are headed by one man holding a bambu runcing, accompanied by their wives and servants. Their wives are armed with wooden staff with a length of about 1 m. Upon the signal of the drum, both men will fight three rounds with the bambu runcing. When their wives begin to shout "Larak, larak" (which means, retreat in Javanese language), so will the fight too for a moment. In an event where one of the men died from stabbing, the king will then order the victor to compensate the family of the dead, but the wife of the dead will be his.

During the Indonesian National Revolution, the lack of weaponry forced Indonesians to turn to bamboo again. The bambu runcing became a well-known weapon in modern Indonesian history. This weapon was used by the Indonesian people as a means of resistance against the Dutch colonials. Today the symbol of the bambu runcing is widely used in various regions in Indonesia to symbolize courage and sacrifice in achieving independence.

K. H. Subchi, of Parakan, Temanggung, was given the informal title Jenderal Bambu Runcing (General Spiked Bamboo). He was the advisor to the Barisan Muslimin Temanggung (Temanggung Muslims Front) which was later known as Barisan Bambu Runcing (Spiked Bamboo Front).

== See also ==
- Arbir
