= Liu Seong Kuntao =

The Liu Seong System is one of the many styles of Kuntao, which are hybrid martial arts systems derived from the cultures of Chinese Indonesia. The Liu Seong system was brought to America, from Indonesia, by Willem A. Reeders (1917-1990).

Willem Reeders was of mixed heritage, being of Dutch and Chinese background, but raised in Indonesia. He received training in a variety of martial arts, no one knows how many exactly. His primary teacher was his great uncle Liu Seong, whose title he bore. His uncle taught him his family's Kuntao system, a sophisticated form of fighting which focuses on close range technique.

Note: See DeMarco (2026) for an alternate version of Reeders' history.

Reeders studied under more than ten silat instructors, training in multiple systems.. It includes Cikalong (Tijkalong), Cimande (Tjimande), Harimau, Serak. He synthesized elements from these various systems into a unified martial arts framework that retains distinct technical movements, strategies, and tactics. The curriculum is structured around principles of physics, anatomy, and psychology, with movement patterns designed for combative efficiency and a high volume of rapid strikes.

Today, Reeder's Kuntao / Liu Seong Gung Fu is thinly spread throughout the United States, with instructors offering variations of the art in Arizona, California, Colorado, Florida, Maryland, Massachusetts, Nevada, New Mexico, New York, Ohio, Pennsylvania, Kansas, Tennessee, Toronto, and Virginia.

== Combination of styles ==
Many styles that are the result of combining different methods are often termed "eclectic" and often are lacking a core, instead relying upon the continual addition of new strategies, tactics, and techniques. The Liu Seong system although hybridized is not at all "eclectic", and the basic movements are also the advanced. Understandings and applications change, but the essential system does not. This allows for a much greater depth in the development of skill owing to the continual refinement of a base that does not inherently change, but instead becomes more advanced.

There are various view points espoused by martial artists about the nature of systems and their development. One view is that although a style may be a hybrid or combination, eventually it develops its own identity and is no longer considered to be 'mixed'. Another view is that all martial arts are indeed hybrids and are the result of a continual process of synthesis and refinement, and any given art in a generational span is, in fact, a 'phase' of its development.

Another extremely valid point of view upon differing martial styles is they are more accurately identified as cultural/social representations. Karate is Okinawan or Japanese, gungfu is Chinese, and so on. Each culture tends to focus on a different approach to the fighting arts, according to their mores.

In one sense, the 'real' difference in arts, beyond cultural distinctions, lies in the strategies and tactics employed.

The Liu Seong system is culturally derived from the arts of China and Indonesia, and accordingly has tactical elements of both. The adopted cultural aspects, primarily school etiquette, may vary between Chinese and Indonesian terminology and practices, and may even include elements of both.

There is an axiom that states that for a system to be valid it must be based upon a greater system. Beyond the consideration of historical and cultural elements, what defines the Liu Seong system is a core of operation that is firmly rooted in the principles of physics, psychology and anatomy. This orientation is what allows the art to weave together two disparate cultural elements and blend differing strategies together into one whole, and in the end, define itself. It is a true synthesis.

== Chinese hands and Indonesian feet ==
Being a synthesis, it has many tactics to draw upon. One basic recognition of this is found in the expression, Chinese hands and Indonesian feet. This refers to the basic combination of Chinese-style (neijia) biomechanics and Indonesian style footwork patterns. The China Hand component teaches good body alignment for power. Indonesian Feet teaches mobility and positioning through the use of footwork 'patterns'.

Because it is greatly influenced by silat, the Liu Seong System is what is known as 'blade aware', and this is reflected in many elements of the posture. Although weapons are rarely used in practice, except in advanced training, movements are made 'as if' the opponent was wielding a knife, stick, or one of other numerous weapons. Gun defense techniques do exist within the context of the system, in order to address this modern concern. The postures used tend to protect most major vital areas and this protection is maintained at all times. This method is known as 'closed body' movement. The closed body movement also has the effect of 'winding up' the practitioner's arms and legs so that he can strike out quickly and 'close up' again so as not to unnecessarily expose the vitals to attack. The guard shape and techniques used in this 'closed body' system are very distinctive and tend to constitute the 'signature' of the system. In great part this 'closed' condition is maintained by the continual position of the back hand in a guard position. Whenever the basic guard posture is changed or a strike is thrown the backup will be in a 'guardian' position.

Often, it is taken to be a form of Pakuachang, although seemingly more angular in nature. Many are of the impression that kuntao and Pakuachang are either the same or highly related. Others cite parallel evolution. Given Reeders' history and circumstance, it is entirely likely he knew both arts. Despite the origin, known or not, in the Liu Seong system there is an inherent use of angulation that tends to be very advantageous in a combat situation, coupled with continuous non-stop entry and penetration. The art doesn't, however, 'go around' to someone to strike, it 'goes to' the target with the use of angles to avoid the opponent's attack. There are a large volume of counter-attack techniques in the system. Counter-time or interceptive techniques are also prevalent. The kuntaoer is extremely difficult to strike because he or she will not be where expected and the kuntaoer does not react to an opponent's strike. By the time an opponent has begun his or her movement, the kuntaoer will have realized it and will have already struck the opponent, occasionally multiple times.

These are a few of the basic characteristics of the system which is a unique combination of the Chinese and Indonesian elements from which is it created.

== Standardization and diversity ==
There is no standardized curriculum, nor is there a central organization to represent the art, to which all chapters subscribe. Each school has its own individualized program of training. Despite the variety of expression found in the art, and the independent nature of the schools, there are more similarities than differences, and often it takes one who is familiar with the system to identify the difference in methods, as they are, in most cases, quite subtle. Experts in the system can often identify who a student trains with just by watching them move. This is due in great part to the fact the many of Reeder's original (first generation American) students are, for the most part, alive and well and heading up their respective chapters. Therefore, their students have a strong model to emulate, and their teacher's 'style' shows in their forms and applications.

The range of these arts is also shown in a wide array of forms (kata, quan, etc.) that are practiced. Different lines of the art have different sets of forms. These forms are often deconstructed and made into smaller patterns of movement for ease of learning and for children's programs, as well as being rearranged in different sequences. These are the individualized training tools developed by different instructors.

Additionally, some chapters have assimilated forms from other sources into the Liu Seong system or teach it in concert with other methods.

== Fundamental strategies, tactics, and techniques ==
The origin of many tactics and techniques in the system is unknown. Speculation of where a particular tactic comes from, in terms of root style, is often a point of discussion amongst practitioners. Because of the hybrid nature of the art, many techniques taken from other arts may very well have been transformed by its absorption in the system to the extent that they no longer resemble their parent art. It is often stated by those that knew Willem Reeders, that he was primarily concerned with the technique applications and fighting tactics of the arts that he studied, not with ritual elements, like forms, or juru-juru (prearranged sequences of movement).

This fact plays out in the many different methods of engagement that can be found within the system. Due to this variety, the art cannot be rigorously classified. The common thread found running through all the schools are the principles of operation. Although Liu Seong encompasses many techniques, its true definition is found in the tactical transitions of the distinctive postures of the style, and the syncopated rhythm of attack which are used to enter, strike and achieve a wide variety of locking and throwing techniques, culminating in finishing attacks upon the downed opponent.

=== Strategy ===
Liu Seong is not an art of self-defense, and not meant for sport competition. Reeder's Kuntao is an extreme art of close-quarters combat. Practitioners spar at less than full speed and strength, and many attacks are not used due to their inherently dangerous nature. This concession is considered a necessity in order to prevent injury to the students. The Liu Seong system, in great part, has not undergone modernization, as have many other disciplines.

Willem Reeders' system of martial arts relies heavily on explosive movement. All strikes and movements must be performed explosively to cause maximum damage and minimize any advantage an opponent may have. Because of the explosive, continuous and fluid movement of the kuntaoer, if an opponent is not incapacitated by the first or second strike, the opponent will often be reacting to strikes that have already been delivered. An opponent may be up to five or six strikes behind. Reeder's Kuntao still retains its old school combat orientation with techniques that are designed to seriously injure or kill an attacker. The essential premise of the art is that for self-defense to be adequate it must take into account the worst possible scenario in which you could find yourself, in a fighting context. Accordingly, this would be having to face multiple, armed attackers who are versed in the martial arts as well. This assumption lays the theoretical basis for the art.

The Liu Seong system is a 'blade aware' or weapons based system which is generally trained without weaponry. Weapons are added to the training at advanced levels as an extension of the hand technique which is considered paramount. This is a departure from the method of many other styles of weapons combat which begin training with weapons first and take up 'empty hand' methods after basic baton, knife, or staff skills have been learned.
