= Savuku =

- Type: Whip
- Place of origin: India

Savuku (Tamil: சவுக்கு, Malay: sauku) is the Tamil word for whip, used both for domestic purposes and traditionally also in hand-to-hand fighting. Its combat application is taught in the Indian martial arts, most notably in silambam and kalaripayat, as well as Indo-Malay silat. Whip techniques in silambam are known as savuku adi and are generally performed from mid-range.

== See also ==
- Kalaripayat
- Weapons of silat
