= Kwitang silat =

Perguruan Silat Mustika Kwitang Kwitang silat
- Hardness: Full-contact, semi-contact, light-contact
- Country of origin: Indonesia (Kwitang village)
- Olympic sport: No

Traditions of Pencak and Silat
- UNESCO Intangible Cultural Heritage
- Country: Indonesia
- Reference: 01391
- Region: Asia and the Pacific

Inscription history
- Inscription: 2019 (14th session)
- List: Representative

Perguruan Silat Mustika Kwitang (Mustika Kwitang Silat School), or simply called Kwitang silat, is a Betawinese pencak silat style (Betawi: maen pukulan). It was originally developed in the Kwitang village, which is now part of the Senen subdistrict in Central Jakarta, Indonesia. This style is a hybrid martial arts, developed by combining the local silat with the Chinese-influenced kuntao. The Mustika Kwitang Silat School was founded in 1945 by H. Muhammad Djaelani (Mad Djaelani), who previously studied the martial arts from his own family.

== Etymology ==
The name Kwitang is probably as a modification of Tjung Tang Kiam's name (a kuntao practitioner); or derived from the name Gnuidang (part of the village where the Chinese settled), which is the Hokkien Amoy spelling for Guangdong in China.

== History ==
There are many versions on the formation of this martial arts in the Kwitang Village. In the mid of the 19th century, the village was inhabited by Betawinese, Chinese and Arab peoples. Most versions agreed that the kuntao martial arts was taught by a Chinese tobacco trader, kuntao practitioner, and medicine man named Tjung Tang Kiam. Tang Kiam, according to researcher G.J.Nawi, was an assistant and a student of Kam Siok, a Tit Khun martial art master from Hokkien (southern China) who visited Batavia in 1840.

Tang Kiam's well known kuntao expertise might have provoked the Betawi silat masters in the area to challenge him in a duel. As the stories go, Mad Djaelani's grandfather succeeded in defeating Tang Kiam, who then taught him the kuntao martial art. It was told that Djaelani's grandfather mastered the Pangeran Papak silat and the kebatinan (inner power forming). The combined silat-kuntao style was then taught internally to his family, and called the Kwitang silat.

During the Indonesian revolution struggle (1945–1949), Mad Djaelani founded the Mustika Kwitang Silat School, and taught his grandson H. Muhammad Zakaria. Djaelani died in 1969, and Zakaria continued as the principal guru of the school. Zakaria had the chance to demonstrate his martial arts in front of the Shotokan master Masatoshi Nakayama and the martial arts author Donn F. Draeger, when they visited Indonesia in the '60's. Draeger then included a review of the Kwitang silat in his book,Weapons and Fighting Arts of Indonesia.

In 1973, the school joined the Persatuan Pencak Silat Putra Betawi (Association of Betawi Martial Arts Schools). The association became one of the 9 "Historic Associations" that supported to the Ikatan Pencak Silat Indonesia (Indonesian Pencak Silat Association), and since then began sending silat athletes regularly to the National Sports Week competition.

The Kwitang silat style currently has spread in various places in Indonesia and abroad.

== Forms ==
Generally known Kwitang silat characteristics are medium horse stance, attractive and energetic movements, and quick and powerful blows. Blocking of enemy attacks tends to be done by pitting the strength of the hands.

=== Basic barehanded forms ===
Below are the names of the basic barehanded forms of Kwitang silat:

1. Sideways punch
2. Straight punch towards the abdomen and block the punch towards the abdomen
3. Straight punch towards the face and block towards the face
4. Sideways punch and block the kick (Lok Bee)
5. Catch the opponent's punch and respond with sideways punch
6. Catch the opponent's punch and respond with elbow and punch
7. Sideways punch and ward block and elbow
8. Catch the opponent's punch and break it

=== Core barehanded forms ===
Below are the names of the core barehanded forms of Kwitang silat, taught after mastering the basic forms:

1. Shoot (continuous punches)
2. Piong
3. Wave 1
4. Wave 2
5. Wave 3
6. Wave 4
7. Wave 5
8. Wave 6
9. Swimming Dragon

=== Weapon forms ===
Below are the names of the weapon forms of Kwitang silat, taught after mastering the basic and core forms:

1. 2 Knives (2 Pisau)
2. Machete (Golok)
3. Staff (Toya)
4. Spear (Koleam)
5. Trident (Taichu)

== See also ==
- Betawi people
- Beksi
- Cingkrik
- Kwitang
