= Primordial qigong =

Form of qigong

Primordial qigong is a form of qigong purportedly developed by the Taoist sage Zhang Sanfeng. Also known as Wuji gong, it is said to have been developed by Zhang before he invented tai chi.

Practitioner Donald Rubbo wrote in Primordial Qigong, A Gem from the Treasure Chest of Taoist Mystical Qigong, "The Primordial Qigong system reflects the wisdom of the ancient Taoist sages and their theory of the birth of the universe. Primordial qigong is a three-dimensional physical mandala, and as such it encompasses all of the primary aspects of Taoist philosophy: the concepts of yin yang, the trinity (heaven, earth and man), the Five Element wuxing theory of Traditional Chinese Medicine, the I Ching, the bagua and the mystical aspects of numbers."

== Overview ==
The Primordial qigong system reflects the Taoist theory of the birth of the universe. The Taoist sages postulated that from the pre-birth state of wuji (Original Emptiness) came the primal spark and from the primal spark, taiji (Supreme Ultimate) was born. From taiji, yin and yang manifested as opposing forces.

Various English language authors have referred to primordial qigong as Tai Chi for Liberation (John P. Milton), Tai Chi for Enlightenment (Michael Winn) and Enlightenment Qigong (Andrew Fretwell).

The bagua is integrated into the primordial qigong form: the eight trigrams are represented by the placement of the body in the center facing the cardinal directions and awareness of the intercardinal directions: northeast, southeast, northwest and southwest, as one turns both counter-clockwise and clockwise throughout the form.

Roger Jahnke quoted Dr. Chen in The Healing Promise of Qi as saying: "The form called Primordial Qigong [Wuji Qigong] reverses time to reconnect the practitioner with the past and with their prebirth state to alter the course of the future. I practiced this Qigong faithfully and took some herbal formulas and, over some time, completely recovered from cancer."

== United States ==
Primordial qigong was brought to the United States by lineage holder Master Zhu Hui, who allegedly healed himself of hepatocirrhosis by practicing this form daily. Zhu was taught primordial qigong by Master Li Tong.

Zhu's students included Donald Rubbo, Michael Winn, Roger Jahnke, and Larry Wong. John P. Milton is another notable teacher of primordial qigong. Milton reports having learned the form at Wudang mountain in China.

== See also ==
- Baguazhang
- Dantian
- I Ching
- Qigong
- Silk reeling
- Taijiquan
- Traditional Chinese medicine
- Xingyiquan
- Zhan zhuang
- Zhang Sanfeng
