= Tunggal Hati Seminari =

Indonesian style of Pencak Silat

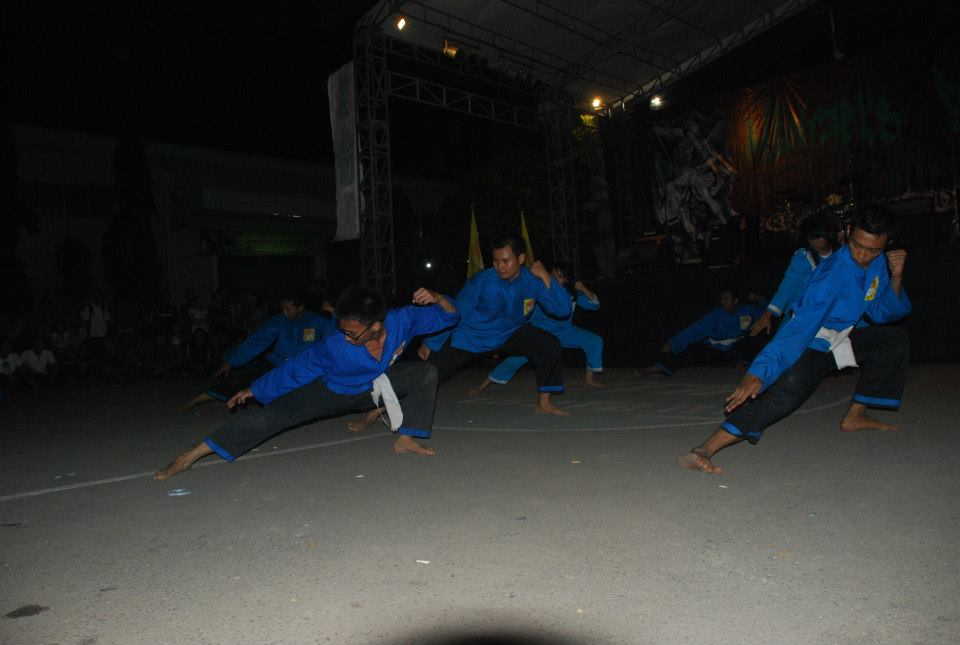
- THS practitioners training
- Creator: Rm. Hadi, Pr.

Traditions of Pencak Silat
- UNESCO Intangible Cultural Heritage
- Country: Indonesia
- Reference: 01391
- Region: Asia and the Pacific

Inscription history
- Inscription: 2019 (14th session)
- List: Representative

Tunggal Hati Seminari (THS) is a style of pencak silat from Indonesia. It incorporates Catholic teachings and embraces the motto Pro Patria et Ecclesia, meaning "for the nation and the church", and the slogan Fortiter in Re Suaviter in Modo, which means "strong principles and soft temper". These encourage a bold, diligent and humble mentality.

By 1987, there were 2300 THS members in Jakarta, Yogyakarta, Surakarta, Wonogiri, Muntilan, Bandung, Lampung, and Banjarmasin. The THS National Coordinating Center is located in Jakarta. Under the National Coordinating Center, the THS is organized by dioceses, while also being organized on the parish level. Tunggal Hati Seminari is also organized in schools and universities, and is noted as having grown in popularity within Indonesia, and multiple neighbouring countries such as Timor Leste.
