= Arbir =

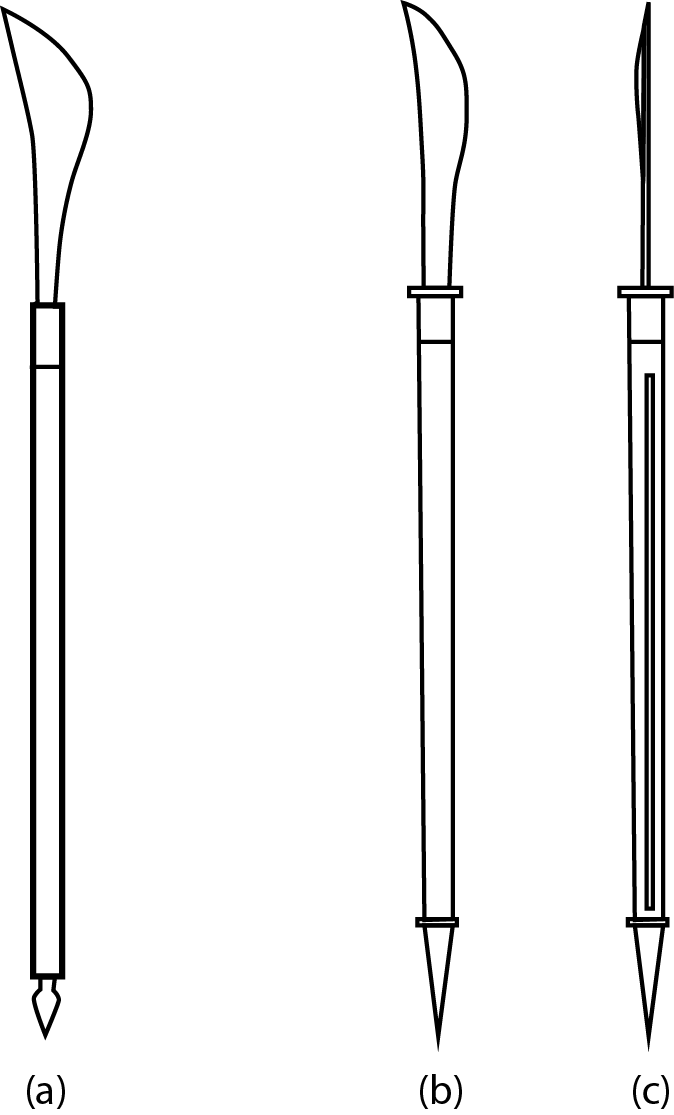
- The Arbir of Pencak Silat: (a)Spear-butted type, (b)spike-butted type, (c) spike-butted type showing groove.
- Type: Glaive
- Place of origin: Indonesia

Service history
- Used by: Pencak Silat exponents

Specifications
- Length: 1.5 m (4 ft 11 in)
- Blade type: Single edge
- Hilt type: Wood

An Arbir is an Indonesian weapon, a glaive, approximately 5 ft (1.5 m) long.

The staff has a shallow groove running along its length marking the plane of the blade, allowing the user to determine exactly where the cutting edge is at all times. The Arbir is one of three special weapons used by members of the Persatuan Pencak Silat Seluruh Indonesia (PPSI).

== See also ==
- Bambu runcing
