= Lian Padukan =

- Focus: Striking
- Hardness: Semi-contact
- Country of origin: Johor, Malaysia
- Creator: Pak Mat Kedidi
- Parenthood: Wushu; Buah pukul Tomoi; Silat Sendeng; Silat Sunting
- Olympic sport: No

Lian Padukan is an offensive martial art that specialises in close-range striking. It is one of Malaysia's biggest silat schools and also the most well-known variant of lian or buah pukul. Because of their shared Yunnan origin, lian padukan is very similar to Chinese Wing Chun.

The origin of the term lian padukan is uncertain. The word lian can either be translated as "game" or "way". Padukan is usually said to derive from paduka meaning royal because the art was originally taught to palace guards and other nobility. Another theory is that it is a combination of the words pukulan (hit) and aduk (mix).

== History ==
The art of lian was brought to Southeast Asia by a Hui (Muslim Chinese) trader from Yunnan, China usually called Abdul Rahman Yunani (Mandarin: Adulaman). Some give him the title of Sheik, asserting that he was a missionary. Others precede his name with Syed claiming that he was part Arab, but such later details weren't present in the original story and had only been added during the Islamisation movement of the 1980s and 90s.

While in Singapore, eight dock-workers attempted to mug Abdul Rahman but he defeated them easily. News of this incident reached the palace of nearby Johor and the royal bodyguard Awang Daik, a silat sunting exponent, wished to test Abdul Rahman's skill. Knowing that he couldn't beat the Chinese trader by himself, Awang Daik asked his friend to accompany him. His friend was Pak Long Mat Yasin, the Muar police chief and a practitioner of silat sendeng. The two pendekar talked with Abdul Rahman and requested that he spar with them. After their repeated entreaties he agreed and fought the pair of them at once. Both Awang Daik and Pak Long were bested by the trader and became his students to redeem themselves.

Singapore at the time was a British colony, and the island's small size made it too tightly-controlled for martial arts to be practiced openly. Instead, Abdul Rahman was invited to teach in the Mersing district where Awang Daik was High Commissioner. He and Pak Long completed their training a few years later, after which Abdul Rahman Yunani left Mersing. His whereabouts are unknown but many believe that he was the same Chinese Muslim credited with bringing a similar style to Sarawak during the same period. Awang Daik and Pak Long continued teaching lian which became known as buah pukul Mersing meaning "Mersing striking techniques".

Derivatives of this style were passed onto the descendants of those who learned it. As buah pukul spread outside the palace, its variations were known by several names including gayang lima, lian Yunan and silat senjata lapan. Lian padukan was founded by Pak Mat Kedidi who first began learning buah pukul from his father. He went on to train under several other masters, including Pak Teh Mat Yasin Kubung and Pak Cik Sani Abu Samah. Under the tutelage of Chu Aman, he became the lineage holder of buah pukul. Pak Mat Kedidi continued training in other martial arts, specifically silat sunting, silat sendeng and tomoi. In the 1970s he tried to combine the lian with these other methods, thereby creating the more direct and aggressive lian padukan.

== Training ==
Unlike most styles of silat, lian padukan is offensive and teaches students to advance before the opponent makes a move. Once the fighter closes in on the opponent, they attack with a continuous combination of hand, foot, elbow, and knee strikes until the enemy has been subdued. All styles of buah pukul contain four main techniques called jurus which introduce the use of punches, kicks, elbows, and knee strikes. Lian padukan further includes the knife-hand as one of its primary attacks. The most basic strike is the polek, a hand-strike in which one hand attacks while the other pulls down the opponent's blocking arm. This is delivered as a rapid series of "rolling" punches or chops aimed at the head or upper body. This rolling action, called gulung, is the most fundamental technique in all variants of buah pukul. Kicks are mostly targeted below the waist but the roundhouse kick is much the same as in tomoi.

After learning all the jurus, students begin training in preset forms called lian. Lian are divided into four "chapters", each of which contain four routines, making a total of sixteen forms. The lian allow students to learn strategies and applications of moves.

== Weapons ==
The quick thrusting hand movements of lian padukan lend themselves to small paired weapons. Thus, the system's primary weapon is the tekpi or three-pronged truncheon. The kris or dagger is used in a similar manner. Other weapons include the Chinese sword and spear.

== See also ==
- Silat Melayu
- Kuntao
- Wing Chun
