= Five Ancestors =

Chinese martial art

Wuzuquan 五祖拳
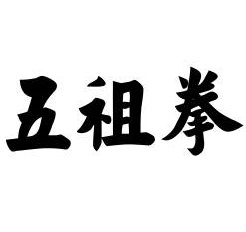
- Also known as: Ngo Cho Kun, Wu Chu Chuan, Five Ancestor Fist
- Focus: Striking, weapons training
- Country of origin: China
- Creator: Taizu-Wuzuquan style (predecessor): attributed to Zhu Yuanzhang; Bai Yu Feng style: Bai Yufeng; Ho Yang Pai style: Chua Giok Beng; Tai Zu style: Gong Po Chan; Yong Chun style: Li Jun Ren
- Famous practitioners: Lo Ban Teng, Lo Siauw Gok, Lo Siaw Tjun, and Lo Hak Loen, Lo Hak Tiang (Jakarta), Liem Tjoei Kang (Surakarta), Kwee King Yang (Surabaya), Sim Yang Tek (Singapore), Chee Kim Thong (Malaysia), Boon Seng Chee (Australia), Lo Yan Chiu and Tan Ka Hong (Philippines), Ng Seow Hooi (Malaysia), Alex Co (Philippines), Mark Wiley (USA)
- Parenthood: Fujian White Crane, Iron shirt, Luohan (martial arts), Monkey Kung Fu, Taizuquan, Dim Mak
- Descendant arts: Likely sister style to the Fujian styles from which certain Okinawa karate styles (Goju Ryu, Uechi Ryu) descended, Nam Pai Chuan, Hung Gar
- Olympic sport: No

Five Ancestor Boxing
- Traditional Chinese: 五祖拳
Transcriptions
Standard Mandarin
- Hanyu Pinyin: wǔzǔquán
Southern Min
- Hokkien POJ: ngó chó kûn

Five Ancestor Boxing (Wuzuquan or Ngo-cho Kun) is a Southern Chinese martial art that consists of principles and techniques from five styles:

- the breathing methods and iron body of Bodhidharma (達尊拳)
- the posture and dynamic power of Luohan (羅漢拳)
- the precision and efficient movement of Emperor Taizu (太祖拳)
- the hand techniques and the complementary softness and hardness of Fujian White Crane (白鶴拳)
- the agility and footwork of Monkey (猴拳)

These five styles and their characteristic techniques were combined during the creation of the Five Ancestor System. They were consolidated by a sixth influence, Xuan Nu, also known as Hian Loo (玄女拳) and "The Lady in the Green Dress", who introduced the most deadly of its techniques, Dim Mak—lethal strikes to the pressure points of the body.

== History ==
The original concept of Wu Zu Quan has its origin in the early practice by Southern Tai Zu martial artist in venerating the Five Ancestors or Wu Zu 五祖 dating as far back as around the 1600s the Five Ancestors are (1) Tai Zu 太祖 for the emperors of China (2) Guan Nim 觀音 the goddess of mercy that is recognize and venerated by both Taoist and Buddhism (3) Lo Han 羅漢 immortal warriors protector of earth later adapted by the warrior monks of Shaolin that were always ready to assist China's emperors in safe guarding the empire's rural areas against bandits, pirates and foreign invaders (4) Da Mo 達尊 the person instrumental in introducing Buddhism to China and (5) Xuan Nu 玄女 the deity of vitality and nourishment later to be related to a female monk responsible in advancing pressure point and herbal science of medicine. In other words, the original concept of Five Ancestors was about the five traditional religious practices of dynasty China which are Taoism, Buddhism, Confucianism, Emperor worshipping and ancestor-deity worshipping this tradition was widely practised by the secret societies called Tien De Hui 天地會 Heaven Earth Society. Since the fall of the Ming dynasty 1644 the Tai Zu Quan was the dominant martial art system especially in Fujian province China. Tai Zu Quan was an amalgamation of all the known martial art systems of that time it was a representation of the dynasty martial prowess and glory.

In the 1800s some Tai Zu masters will redefine Wu Zu to Wu Zu Quan. The two most prominent Tai Zu masters that will create and redefine Wu Zu to Wu Zu Quan were (1) Li Jin Ren 李俊仁 his Wu Zu Quan will be known as Yong Chun Wu Zu Quan 永春五祖拳 and (2) Chua Giok Beng 蔡玉明 his Wu Zu will be refer as Wu Zu Quan Ho Yang Pai 五祖拳何阳派. Both founders created their version of Wu Zu making it about martial arts. While many Tai Zu martial artist embraced, and join either Yong Chun or Ho Yang Pai Wu Zu Quan, others did not they continue to retain the original concept of Tai Zu Wu Zu. And because of the shared roots, history, tradition such as the green lion, the martial art systems the many forms, the concept and principle of the Sam Chien, Tai Cho Wu Zu and Wu Zu Quan will become one and inseparable.

Later in the late 1950s another version of Wuzuquan history-origin will be revealed thanks to the late Grand master Chee Kim Thong from Malaysia putting the founding of the art around 1300 AD attributed to Bái Yùfeng,^{[1]} a famous 13th century monk from the original Henan Shaolin Temple in the North of China to whom Five Animals style and Hóngquán (洪拳) have also been attributed.

It is believed during the fall of the Ming dynasty many Bai Yu Feng disciples will flee to Fujian province integrating with Fujian martial art system such as the Yong Chun White Crane. Thus, the history of Wu Zu Quan have four versions:

1. Tai Zu Wuzuquan 太祖五祖拳 early Tai Zu martial artist venerate the Five Ancestors.
2. Yong Chun Wuzuquan 永春五祖拳 founded by Li Jun Ren 李俊仁 sometime in the late 1800s base in Yong Chun Fujian China. Both Li and Chua were close martial art friends.
3. Ho Yang Pai Wuzuquan 鹤阳派五祖拳 founded by Chua Giok Beng at the same time sometime in the late 1800s.
4. Bai Yu Feng Wuzuquan 白玉峰五祖拳 a northern system that migrated to Fujian China and integrated with Fujian Tai Zu system.

Some practitioners also credit a sixth influence of the Xuan Nu (玄女拳) system, with its emphasis on flowing movements and humility, for refining the art of Five Ancestors. ^{[2]}

== Styles ==
The Five Fighting Styles are:

1. Grand Ancestor Boxing (Taizu Quan): The characteristic of this boxing style is its solidity and internal strength. The feeling of the stance is that of the feet gripping the ground. The arms and legs are hard as iron and the twisting of the waist is like a lively dragon. Further, the body is said to be like an iron shield and the advancing steps like a ferocious tiger pouncing on its prey. Attacking and defending moves are executed simultaneously. Although it seems like one is working with hardness and tension, the transitions between movements are subtle and smooth.

2. Arhat Boxing (Luohan Quan): This style was developed in the initial Shaolin era and named for Da Mo, who came from India to spread health-preservation exercises to the Chinese people; these exercises were incorporated into existing systems and later known as Shaolin martial arts and Qlgong. The footwork of Luohan Quan is a front-bow, back-arrow horse stance. The arms are like iron; the hands and palms like those of a dragon playing with water. The attacking techniques are not head-on but rather from the sides.

3. White Crane Boxing (Baihe Quan): White Crane features the power of the forearm for striking and parrying. Combined with its rapid change of footwork, the method of hooking and seizing to control an opponent's arm is sudden and powerful. The characteristics of this boxing is to train the practitioner to be agile in footwork and movement. White Crane Qin na is also an exceptional skill to master.

4. Monkey boxing (Hou Quan): Relying on its characteristic nimbleness and agility, Hou Quan emphasizes short, rapid movements to engage the enemy. Using techniques to feint and confuse the opponent, it is adept with catching, striking, and finger techniques for defense and attack. Its best feature is the quick change of body, speed, and strength of hand and palm. It is also famous for ground techniques such as rolling, tumbling, and other deceiving actions. Most of its attacks are aimed at the opponent's knees, groin area, throat, or eyes. Hand strikes are typically open-hand slaps or claws with a semi-closed fist (the monkey claw).

5. Soft Boxing (Xuan Nu Quan): A soft but powerful fighting style characterized by the use of a relaxed tension to overcome an opposing force and redirect it at the opponent. Emphasizing softness as a means of training it works to condition the tendons, bones, and muscles into an elastic strength. Xuan Nu Quan trains the student to emit power by transferring strength from the legs through the waist and to the arms. Among all of the five arts, Xuan Nu Quan is hardest to master, but once attained, it serves to complete mastery of the art of Wuzu Quan. The practitioner will come to understand the harmony of hardness and softness, internal and external, and the theory and principles of Taiji as the Grand Ultimate.

== Characteristics ==
One of the primary characteristics of Five Ancestors is its reliance on the Sam Chien (literally "three battles":三戦) stance and the corresponding hand form of the same name, which it obtained from Fujian White Crane. The "three battles" refer primarily to the three stages of Wuzu practitioners can achieve: combat preparation, combat tactic and combat strategy; all of which must be mastered in order to attained a good level. "Three Battles" has multi-faceted meaning: conceptual, physical, and spiritual.

Sam Chien can also be said to allow development of the eight Five Ancestor principles and so, is considered the most important form in the style. Indeed, it is said that this form contains all the principles of the Five Ancestors system. Thus it is the first form taught to junior students, so that they may explore the essential points of Five Ancestors from the start of their training. With the practitioner's progress in understanding the essence of Sam Chien, all of their movements are immediately improved as a consequence. Thus, it is a strong adage believed by senior/master level practitioners that, without the most basic essential understanding of Sam Chien, all of the fighting forms are rendered as much less effective. Fighting forms are relatively uncomplicated, but have a heavy reliance on one's Sam Chien evolving understanding. Thus, Sam Chien keeps being practised even by those who are very senior in the arts: "Since the beginning learning Sam Chien. Until pass away keeps learning Sam Chien." The writer here can't emphasize enough that junior practitioners see how important it is to keep training Sam Chien while progressing to learn different forms at the same time. It looks and feels boring, but without it a Wuzuquan practitioner is nothing.

Although the exact method depends on the school, Five Ancestors is known for its large variety of power generational methods. Due to the distinct character of each ancestor, these methods change depending on the power required. Some schools teach tension forms that develop power, of which there are about ten, and fist forms that train technique, of which there are dozens. Others stress a relaxed body, instead seeking maximum transmission of the relevant jin. For the He Yang (何阳)branch/School, these 2 extremes are represented by the Lu Wanding/Lo Ban Teng (盧萬定) lineages representing the earlier. The teaching of Lu style is mostly in Indonesia (in the city of Jakarta and Surakarta/Solo). The latter is represented by the latter teaching of Shen Yangde/Sim Yang Tek (沈扬徳) whose style evolved from more direct in the earlier teaching In Xiamen to the "seeking maximum transmission of the relevant jin "when he had moved to Singapore. The Surakarta/Solo branch has a unique execution as it integrates the Lu and the earlier Shen's teaching. For those who are intimate to the art, GM Liem’s style could be said “upper body Sim, lower body Lo.” The style was popularized in solo by Lin Shui Gang/Liem Tjoei Kang (林水港) who was the nephew of Lu as well as an adopted son of Shen. In the surface, it seems to be counter-intuitive to integrate two opposite spectrum of teaching. However, the underlying principle of He Yang lineages are the same and the integration follows the principles taught by Coshu He Yang and proven as effective as the other lineages. "Hard" and "soft" are relative concepts in Wuzuquan as it is like a fine combing. However, for those with proficiency in the style, there exist a correlation with the ideal fighting distance: the "softer" one school's style is perceived within Wuzuquan, the shorter is the ideal/preferred fighting distance. This is a consequence of the emphasis of the school's power generation method, again usually is only perceivable to those who have prowess in the arts.

The six principles of the footwork are as follows:

1. Big Gate
2. Small Gate
3. Middle Gate
4. Front Gate
5. Back Gate
6. Turn Gate

The base fajin are the same as other southern styles:

- Tun (Swallow)
- Tu (Spit)
- Fu (Float)
- Chen (Sink)

but Five Ancestors also adds on top of it a second set:

- Fen (Scatter)
- Bi (Fold)
- Tuo (Prop)
- Dun (Stop)

The five power generation methods are as follows:

1. Legs
2. Pelvis
3. Body
4. Dantian
5. Inch Chase

On top of this are miscellaneous hand forms, two-man forms (also known as form-drill) that may or may not include sticking hands, and forms for a comprehensive arsenal of weapons including rice bowl and chopsticks, umbrellas, and even opium pipes.

Over the decades masters have added to this list, introducing material they considered relevant to the time.

Five Ancestors is now taught in China, Malaysia, Philippines, Indonesia, Singapore, Australia, New Zealand, Ireland, Sweden, the United Kingdom, Germany, Norway, Sweden, the United States, Switzerland, Canada, Denmark, and Spain.

== Governance ==
The peak international body for Wuzuquan is the International South Shaolin Wuzuquan Federation 国际南少林五祖拳联谊总会, which was established in 1989. Some of the early President of the Federation were Dr. Lo King Hui, Dr. Chee Kim Thong, Grand master Zhou Kun Ming, Grand master Yap Ching Hai, Grand Master Han Jin Yuan, Grand master John Graham. The twelfth President of the Federation is James Chee of Australia, who took over from John Graham of the United States in November 2011. The current President 2013 -2016 is Grand master Henry Lo 盧思明 of Philippines. The Federation convenes annually in Quanzhou, Fujian, China with discussions held regarding the preservation, expansion and unity of the art.

== Ranking system ==
An internationally recognized ranking system for Wuzuquan practitioners was established at the 2010 International Shaolin Wuzuquan Federation conference, in Quanzhou China. A ten level (duan) system was agreed upon for the most senior grades, and mirrors the equivalent systems used in karate (dan) and taekwondo. The 10th duan is recognised as the highest level, whilst the 1st duan is the lowest. However, not all legitimate branches actively participate in the union.

The first group of honorary 10th duan Wuzuquan practitioners to be formally recognized includes both living and deceased masters. These masters are awarded the duan for their involvement in the promotion of Wuzuquan. These 10th duan practitioners include Chee Kim Thong (Malaysia), Yap Ching Hai (Malaysia), Kim Han (United Kingdom), James Chee (Australia), Lu Qing Hui (Philippines), Hsu Nai Jing (Singapore), Chen Hung (Philippines), Su Zai Fu (Quanzhou), Zhi Yuan Li (Philippines), Shan Fa (Taiwan), Huang Qing Jiang (Quanzhou), Lu Si Ming (Philippines), Hong Dun Geng (Hong Kong).

John Graham of the United States was awarded the rank of 10th duan at the 2011 International Shaolin Wuzuquan Federation conference.
