= Seni Gayung Fatani =

- Emblem of the Seni Gayung Fatani
- Also known as: Gayung Fatani
- Date founded: 14 September 1976
- Country of origin: Malaysia
- Founder: Anuar Abdul Wahab (1945–2009)
- Current head: Mohd Safwan Abu Hassan
- Arts taught: Silat
- Official website: Seni Gayung Fatani Malaysia

Seni Gayung Fatani is a martial art, specifically a style of silat from Malaysia based on the art of war, the combination punch and kick striking, joint-locking and grappling techniques, and various type of melee weapon. In Malay, the word seni means art and gayung is a word for martial arts, synonymous with silat. Fatani means wise in Arabic and was chosen in 1976 by the councils of Guru Tua (Senior Masters). The first grandmaster of the silat is Tuan Guru Hj Anuar Abd. Wahab (1976–2009). The second grandmaster was Tuan Guru Aminuddin Haji Anuar (2009–2023) and the current grandmaster of Seni Gayung Fatani Malaysia (from 2023) is Grandmaster Mohd Safwan Abu Hassan.

== Origin ==
Seni Gayung Fatani originated from the Malays Empire. In 1840, it was brought to Kedah by Syeikh Abdul Rahman. The style was expanded upon by his son Tok Yah Ramli. Another of Abdul Rahman's students was Pak Teh Mat Ali who taught this style to Pak Andak Embong, who in turn passed it down to Tuan Guru Anuar Abdul Wahab. When it was registered in 1976 as an association under the government's Society Act, it was formally renamed the Seni Gayung Fatani Association.

== Silat Curriculum ==
Silat practitioners learn different styles of attacking and defensive skills such as Elakan (avoidance techniques), Tangkisan (blocking techniques), Tangkapan (catching techniques), Potong (counter-strikes), Amuk (rampaging with due diligence), and weaponry systems such as sickles, swords, cudgels, kris (a short wavy dagger), ropes, walking sticks made of hardwood, daggers with straight cutting edges, and trisulas. Practical self-defense, unarmed self-defense, and self-defense with knives will also be taught at each silat level.

This comprehensive training ensures that silat practitioners are prepared to handle various types of strikes, whether in one-on-one situations or group encounters. The syllabus at each level explains how to navigate different fighting scenarios, reminiscent of strategies employed in ancient Malay warfare. It is crucial to understand that Silat Malaysia teaches its students that prevention is better than cure; it's preferable to avoid a fight than to engage in one. In silat, harming or killing others is prohibited, except in desperate situations where there is no alternative for defending oneself. Fighting is seen as a last resort when there are no other solutions to prevent being killed.

The organization produced martial arts books in Malay through collaboration with the National Department for Culture and Arts (JKKN) in 2016.

== Sports ==
- Silat Olahraga
- Silat Tempur
- Silat Seni
- M-1** (need more information)

== List of Competitions Organized ==
- National Silat Tempur Competition 2014 (Zone 1), Universiti Malaya, KUALA LUMPUR (10 – 12/04/14)
- National Silat Tempur Competition 2014 (Zone 2), Universiti Teknologi MARA, SEREMBAN (21 – 23/08/14)
- National Silat Tempur Competition 2014 (Zone 3), Seri Gelora Hall, KUANTAN (23 – 25/12/14)
- National Silat Tempur Competition 2015, Section 7 Hall, BANDAR BARU BANGI (07 – 09/05/15)
- National Silat Tempur Competition 2017 (Series 1), Section 2 Hall, BANDAR BARU BANGI (24 -26/08/17)
- National Silat Tempur Competition 2017 (Series 2), Section 7 Hall, BANDAR BARU BANGI (23 – 25/11/17)
- National Silat Tempur Competition 2018 (Series 1), Sherwood Gateway Hotel, BANDAR BARU BANGI (25 – 27/01/18)
- National Silat Tempur Competition 2018 (Series 2), Sherwood Gateway Hotel, BANDAR BARU BANGI (03 – 05/05/18)
- National Silat Tempur Competition 2018 (Series 3), Sherwood Gateway Hotel, BANDAR BARU BANGI (09 – 11/08/18)
- National Silat Tempur Competition 2018 (Series 4), Kinrara Resort Hotel, PUCHONG (31/01 – 02/12/18)
- National Silat Tempur Competition 2019 (Series 1), Kinrara Resort Hotel, PUCHONG (22 – 24/03/19)
- National Silat Tempur Competition 2019 (Series 2), Kinrara Resort Hotel, PUCHONG (03 – 05/05/19)
- National Silat Tempur Competition 2019 (Series 3), Kinrara Resort Hotel, PUCHONG (27 – 29/09/19)
- National Silat Tempur Competition 2019 (Series 4), Kinrara Resort Hotel, PUCHONG (30/11 – 02/12/19)
- International Invitational Silat Tempur & Silat Seni Competition 2020, Everly Hotel, PUTRAJAYA (10 – 12/10/20)
- National & International Invitational Silat Competition 2022 (Silat Tempur, Silat Seni & Silat Olahraga), Everly Hotel, PUTRAJAYA (28 – 30/09/22)
- National Silat Competition 2023 (International Invitational) (Silat Olahraga, Silat Tempur, Silat Seni), Space U8 Mall, SHAH ALAM (16 – 18/06/23)
- National Silat Competition (Piala Merdeka 2023) (Silat Olahraga, Silat Tempur, Silat Seni), Dpulze Shopping Mall, CYBERJAYA (18 – 20/08/23)

== List of Events Organized ==
- National Silat Awards 2017 (Anugerah Silat Kebangsaan 2017), Bluewave Hotel, SHAH ALAM (15/07/2017)
- National Silat Awards 2018 (Anugerah Silat Kebangsaan 2018), Kinrara Resort Hotel, PUCHONG (08/12/2018)
- National Silat Awards 2019 (Anugerah Silat Kebangsaan 2019), Kinrara Resort Hotel, PUCHONG (01/02/2020)
- National Silat Awards 2020 (Anugerah Silat Kebangsaan 2020), Perdana Hotel KLCC, KUALA LUMPUR (04/12/2021)
- National Silat Awards 2021 (Anugerah Silat Kebangsaan 2021), Laman Puteri 3 Hall, PUCHONG (28/05/2022)
- National Silat Awards 2022 (Anugerah Silat Kebangsaan 2022), Alamy Hall, Space U8 Mall, SHAH ALAM (28/01/2023)
- National Silat Awards 2023 (Anugerah Silat Kebangsaan 2023), Perdana Hotel KLCC, KUALA LUMPUR (23/05/2024)
- 1st Global Scientific Martial Arts and Cultural Congress (GSMACC) 2018, Kompleks Sukan Negeri, SANDAKAN (18/08/2018)
- 2nd Global Scientific Martial Arts and Cultural Congress (GSMACC) 2020 & IMACSSS 2020, Everly Hotel, PUTRAJAYA (10 – 12/10/20)
- 3rd Global Scientific Martial Arts and Cultural Congress (GSMACC) 2021, Space U8 Mall, SHAH ALAM (21 – 24/07/2022)
- 4th Global Scientific Martial Arts and Cultural Congress (GSMACC) 2022 & IMAF 2022, Everly Hotel, PUTRAJAYA (28 – 30/09/22)
- 5th Global Scientific Martial Arts and Cultural Congress (GSMACC) 2024 & IMACSSS 2024, Everly Hotel, PUTRAJAYA (14 – 16/10/24)
- Majlis Iftar Amal Seni Gayung Fatani & FSR UiTM 2022, Perdana Hotel KLCC, KUALA LUMPUR (19/04/2022)
- Rumah Terbuka Aidilfitri PSGFM Official 2019, Teratak Pendekar, SHAH ALAM (06/06/2019)

== List of International Events Participated ==
- 3rd IMACSSS Conference (Rzeszow, Poland – 2014)
- 5th IMACSSS Conference (Rio Maior, Portugal – 2016)
- 7th IMACSSS Conference (Rzeszow, Poland – 2018)
- 8th IMACSSS Conference (Viseu, Portugal – 2019)
- 9th IMACSSS Conference (Putrajaya, Malaysia – 2020)
- 10th IMACSSS Conference (Chongqing, China – 2021)
- 11th IMACSSS Conference (Rzeszow, Poland – 2022)
- 12th IMACSSS Conference (Osaka, Japan – 2023)
- 13th IMACSSS Conference (Putrajaya, Malaysia – 2024)
- The 9th ASEAN Council of Physical Education and Sport (ACPES) Conference (Mahasarakham University, Thailand – 2023)
- ICoSHR VII 7th International Conference On Sport Science, Health And Recreation ( UNP Padang Hotel, Sumatera Barat, Indonesia – 2023)
- 4th International Conference on Movement, Health and Exercise (MoHE) (Berjaya Waterfront Hotel, Johor Bahru – 2017)
- International Colloquium on Sports Science, Exercise, Engineering and Technology (ICoSSEET 2016) (Le Meridien Hotel, Kota Kinabalu – 2016)
- Para ASEAN Games (Kuala Lumpur – 2017)
- Bengkel Pergendangan Muzik Silat Baku Malaysia (Avillion Hotel, Port Dickson – 2014)
- Bengkel Pergendangan Muzik Silat Baku Malaysia (Space U8 Mall, Shah Alam – 2023)
- Kongres Warisan Melayu Sedunia (Matrade Exhibition & Convention Centre, Kuala Lumpur – 2014)

== See also ==
- Silat Melayu
