= Pencak Silat Harimau =

Indonesian martial art

Pencak Silat Harimau Silat Harimau
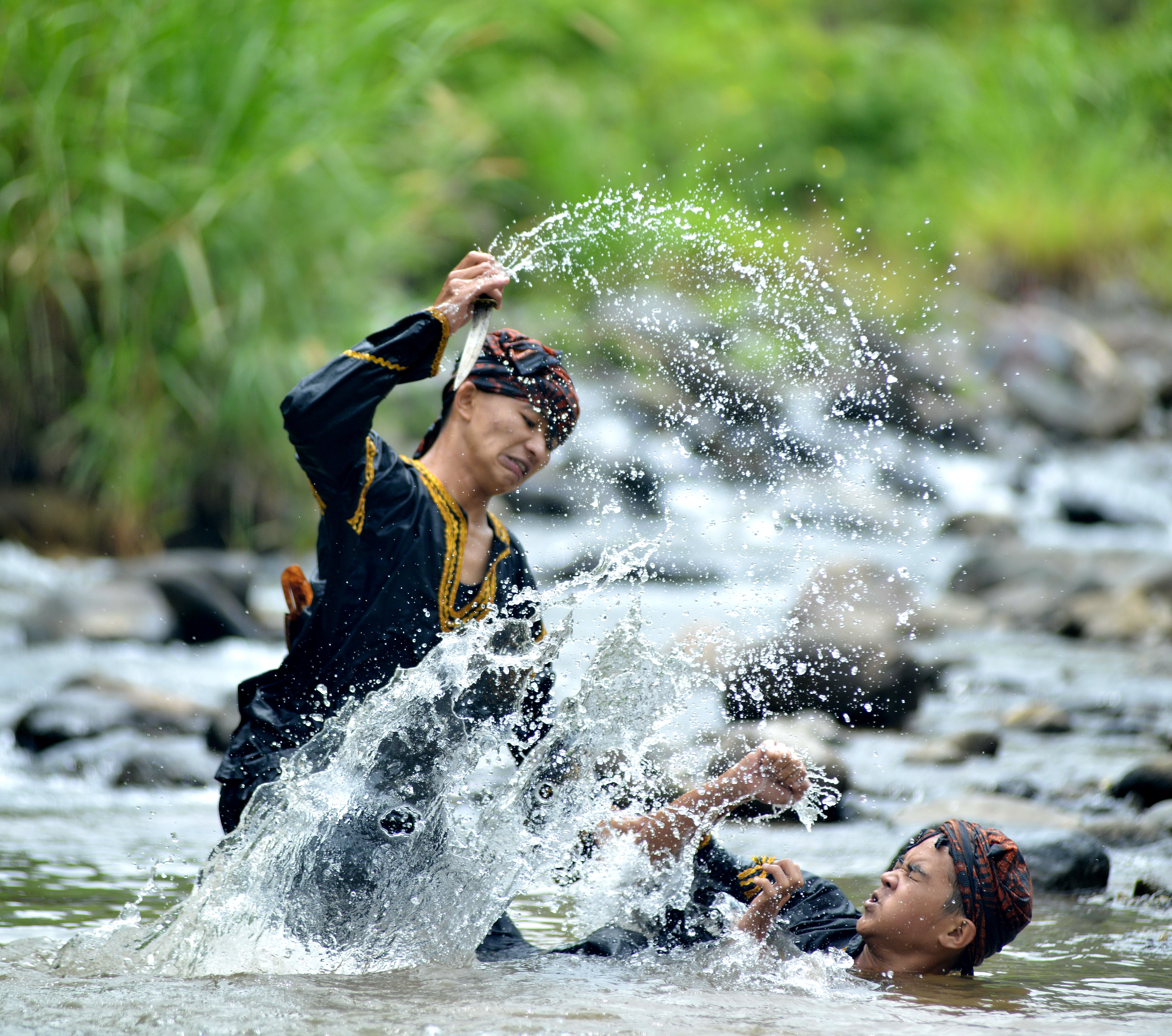
- Pencak silat of Silat or Silek Harimau duel, one of the combatants is using kerambit
- Also known as: Silek Harimau (Minangkabau spelling), Pencak Silat Harimau (Indonesian spelling)
- Focus: Self-Defense
- Hardness: Full-contact, semi-contact, light-contact
- Country of origin: Indonesia (West Sumatra)
- Olympic sport: No

Traditions of Pencak Silat
- UNESCO Intangible Cultural Heritage
- Country: Indonesia
- Reference: 01391
- Region: Asia and the Pacific

Inscription history
- Inscription: 2019 (14th session)
- List: Representative
- List: Silek (inc. Silat Harimau), Mancak, Ulu Ambek/Alau Ambek, Sewah, Galuik (West Sumatera); Bepencak (Bangka); Pencé (Banten); Silat (West Java, Special Capitol Region of Jakarta, Banten, Central Java, East Java, Special Region of Yogyakarta, Bali); Penca, Amengan, Ulinan, Maénpo, Usik, Heureuy (West Java); Maen Pukulan (Special Capitol Region of Jakarta); Akeket, Okol, Penthengan (Madura, East Java); Encak, Pencakan (East Java); Pencak (Special Region of Yogyakarta, East Java, Bali); Kuntau (West Kalimantan, Central Kalimantan, South Kalimantan, East Kalimantan); Langga (Gorontalo), Amanca (South Sulawesi); Pakuttau (West Sulawesi), Mencak, Kuntuh (West Nusa Tenggara).

Pencak Silat Harimau also known as Silat Harimau (Minangkabau: Silek Harimau) is a Minangkabau style of pencak silat originating from West Sumatra, Indonesia. Silat Harimau has movements that are used to resemble the technique and philosophy of a tiger. Silat harimau has agile techniques and beautiful movements. However, behind these techniques and movements, there are various deadly attacks that are applied to immobilize the enemy very quickly.

This movement is known to be quite painful and makes the opponent unable to move and can only lie down with a body that cannot fight back. In addition, Silat Harimau also uses claws as a weapon to attack his opponent. The claws aim at the neck, face and vital parts of the opponent. This technique is a characteristic that does not exist in other Pencak silat.

== History ==
Silat Harimau is a variation of silek, a type of Indonesian pencak silat that originates from the Minangkabau culture in West Sumatra. Silat Harimau was first created in the Pariangan area, in 1119 by Datuk Suri Dirajo. At that time, Datuk Suri Diarjo trained the royal troops with various different silat styles, because in ancient times the silat troops often faced one-on-one, one-on-three, or one-on-four battles. The main key for a fighter to win the battle is to defeat the enemy head-on as quickly as possible.

== Movement ==
The Silat Harimau movement belongs to the "campa tiger" movement which is the result of a combination with immigrants from Champa with a characteristic close combat style of fighting, where during battle, the fighters are immediately positioned in the front row. This style will in the future become the forerunner to the establishment of Silek Harimau which was taught by Edwel Yusri Datuak Rajo Gampo Alam.

== Clothing ==
The clothes used for Silat Harimau are black clothes which are better known as "endong" or "galembong". This black itself has the meaning of "tahan tapo" (resistant to exposure) and black clothes are better for silek than white clothes that quickly look dirty. Silek clothes are made loose on the thighs to make it easier for Pesilek to make movements to be more flexible and agile. Movements such as jumping and there are some acrobatic movements. And there is also such a thing as "deta", the name for a typical Minangkabay headband that is shaped like a horn of various patterns attached to the head.

== Weapon ==
The typical weapon of Silat Harimau is a small hand-held knife shaped like a tiger's claw. The western world calls it Karambit and in Indonesia it is called Kerambit / Karambiak. This weapon is the original weapon of the Minangkabau people. This weapon is dangerous because it can be used to slash or tear the opponent's limbs quickly and undetected. Karambit is deliberately designed to be more curved like a tiger's claw, after seeing a tiger fight with its claws, this is in line with the Minangkabau philosophy which says that "Alam takambang jadi guru". This Karambit weapon is commonly used in Tiger Silat because it symbolizes the claws and some use a knife which symbolizes the fangs of a tiger.

== See also ==
- Pencak Silat
- Styles of silat
- Indonesian martial arts
