= Malays (ethnic group) =

Austronesian ethnic group

Orang Melayu اورڠ ملايو
- Malay tricolour

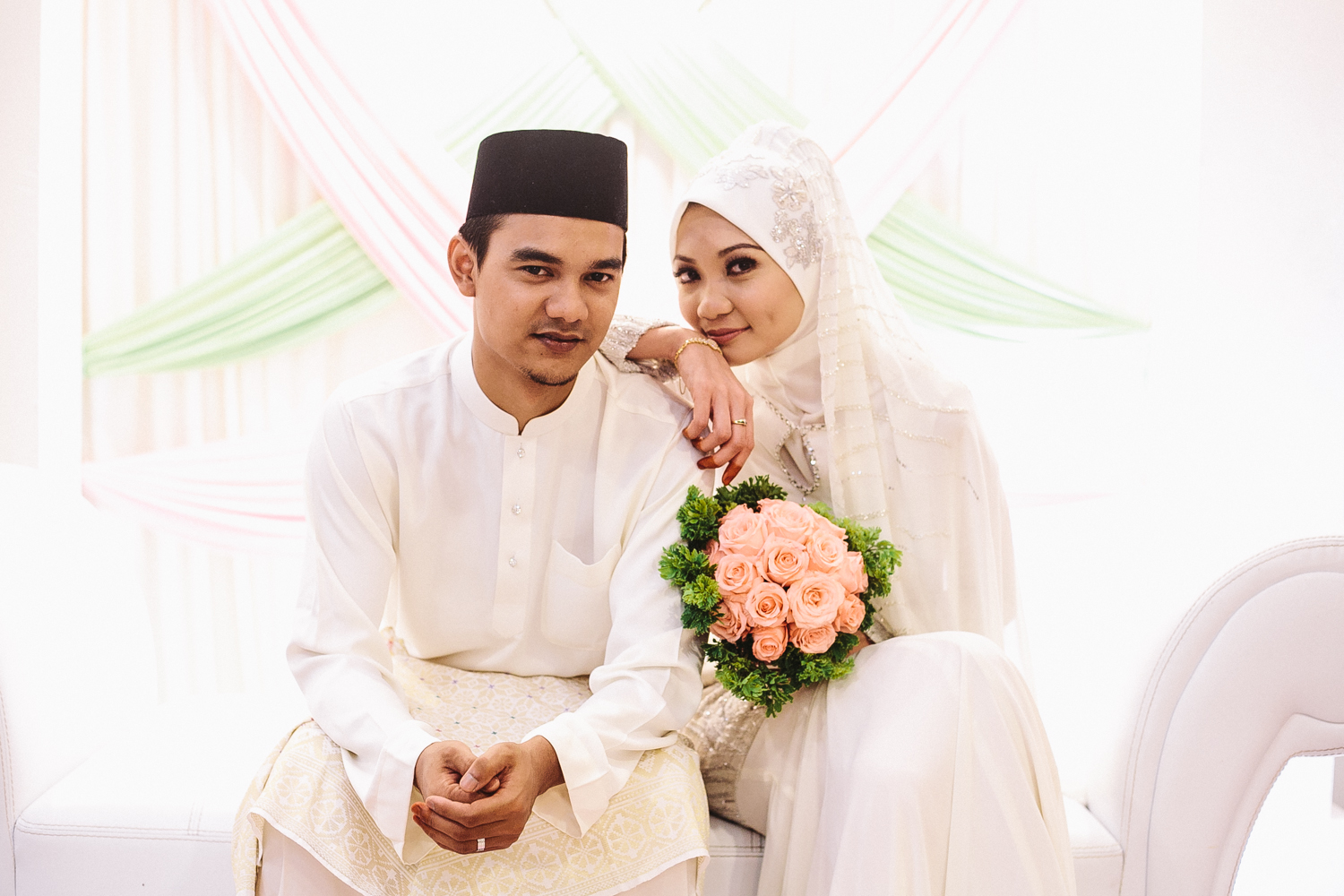
- A Malay couple in traditional attire after their marriage ceremony (akad nikah). The groom is wearing a baju melayu with songkok and songket, while the bride wears baju kurung with a tudong.

Total population
- 30 million+

Regions with significant populations
- Malay world: 30 million (Note: The definition of the Malay ethnicity can be different in every country, especially between those of Malaysia and Singapore, which are nearly the same, and that of Indonesia.)
- Malaysia: 17,600,000 (Note: For definition of Malays in Malaysia, see Article 160)
- Indonesia: 8,553,791 (Note: This number only provides the ethnic group population that lies under the term "Malay" (Melayu) according to the Indonesian government criterion, namely Melayu Asahan, Melayu Deli, Melayu Riau, Melayu Langkat, Melayu Palembang, Asahan, Melayu, Melayu Lahat, and Melayu Semendo in some part of Sumatra.)
- Thailand: 2,150,950
- Singapore: 545,498 (Note: This refers to persons of Malay or Indonesian origin, such as Javanese, Boyanese, Bugis, etc.)
- Brunei: 314,560
- Arab world: ~50,000
- Sri Lanka: 40,189
- Australia: 33,183
- United Kingdom: ~33,000
- United States: 29,431
- Myanmar: 27,000
- Cambodia: 18,000
- Canada: 16,920
- Japan: 11,287

Languages
- Native: Malay; Also: Indonesian (in Indonesia) · Thai · (in Thailand) · English · Arabic (religious only) · Other

Religion
- Predominantly Sunni Islam

Related ethnic groups
- Other Austronesian peoples

Malays (Note: /məˈleɪ/ mə-LAY) (Malay: Orang Melayu, Jawi script: اورڠ ملايو) are an Austronesian ethnoreligious group native to the Malay Peninsula, eastern Sumatra, coastal Borneo, and the smaller islands that lie between these locations — areas that are collectively known as the Malay world. These locations are today part of the countries of Malaysia, Indonesia (Sumatra, Bangka Belitung Islands, Borneo (Kalimantan) and Riau Islands), southern part of Thailand (Pattani, Satun, Songkhla, Yala and Narathiwat), Singapore and Brunei.

There is considerable linguistic, cultural, artistic and social diversity among the many Malay subgroups, mainly due to hundreds of years of immigration and assimilation of various regional ethnicity and tribes within Maritime Southeast Asia. Historically, the Malay population is descended primarily from the earlier Malayic-speaking Austronesians and Austroasiatic tribes who founded several ancient maritime trading states and kingdoms, notably Brunei, Kedah, Langkasuka, Gangga Negara, Chi Tu, Nakhon Si Thammarat, Pahang, Melayu, and Srivijaya.

The advent of the Malacca Sultanate in the 15th century triggered a major revolution in Malay history, the significance of which lies in its far-reaching political and cultural legacy. Common definitive markers of Malayness—the religion of Islam, the Malay language and traditions—are thought to have been promulgated during this era, resulting in the ethnogenesis of the Malay as a major ethnoreligious group in the region. In literature, architecture, culinary traditions, traditional dress, performing arts, martial arts and royal court traditions, Malacca set a standard that later Malay sultanates emulated. The golden age of the Malay sultanates in the Malay Peninsula, Sumatra and Borneo saw many of their inhabitants, particularly from various tribal communities like the Batak, Dayak, Orang Asli, and the Orang Laut become subject to Islamisation and Malayisation. In the course of history, the term "Malay" has been extended to other ethnic groups within the "Malay world"; this usage is nowadays largely confined to Malaysia and Singapore, where descendants of immigrants from these ethnic groups are termed as anak dagang ("traders") and who are predominantly from the Indonesian archipelago, such as the Acehnese, Banjarese, Bawean, Bugis, Mandailing, Minangkabau, and Javanese.

Throughout their history, the Malays have been known as a coastal-trading community with fluid cultural characteristics. They absorbed, shared and transmitted numerous cultural features of other local ethnic groups, such as those of Minangkabau and Acehnese.

== Etymology ==
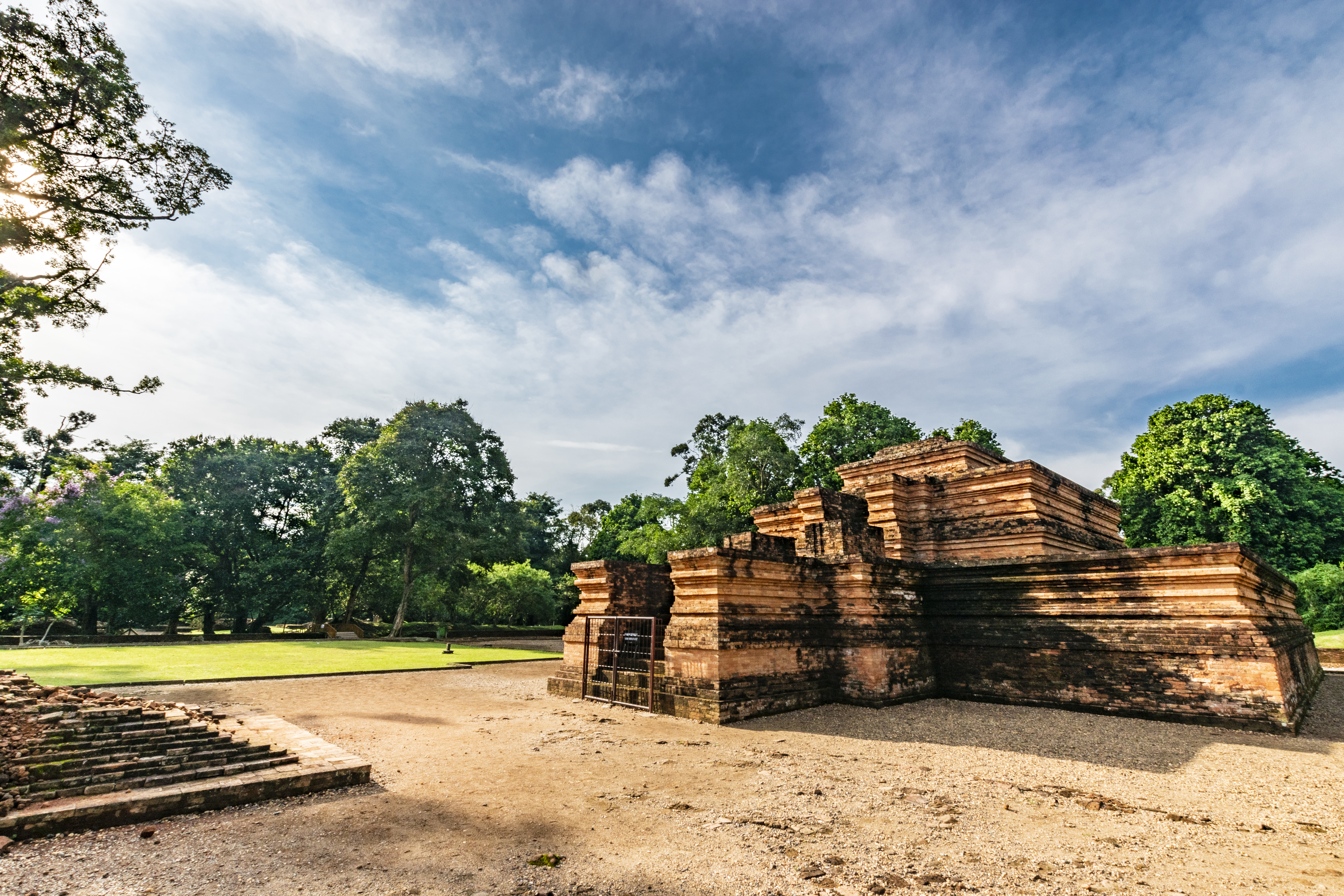
Muaro Jambi Temple Compounds in Jambi, historically linked to the pre-Islamic Melayu Kingdom. The Melayu-Srivijayans were known to construct complex building system in its capital, major cities and important urban centres.

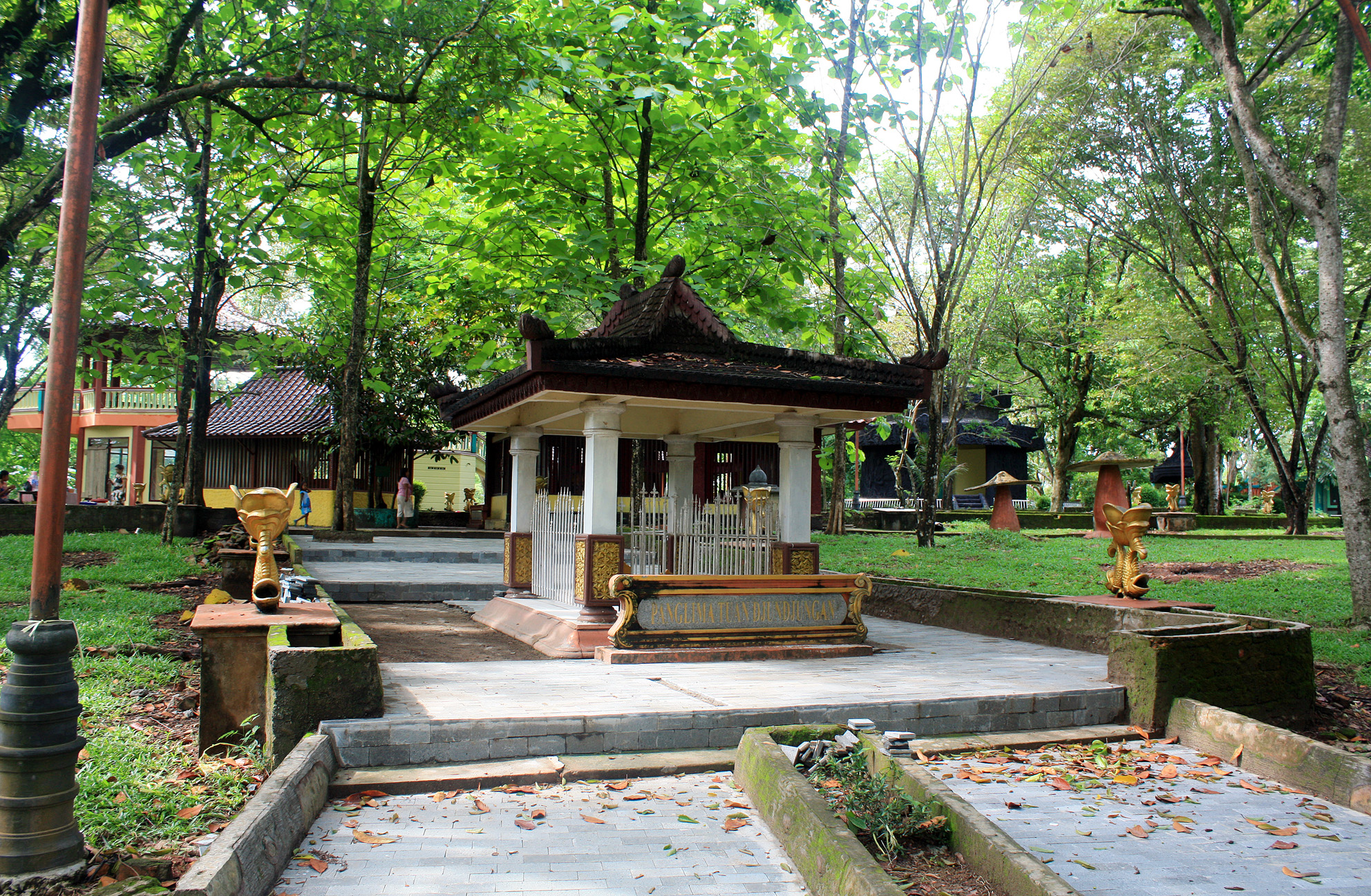
Bukit Seguntang in Palembang. According to Sejarah Melayu, the hill recorded the advent of Sang Sapurba, a legendary progenitor for various Malay royal houses in Sumatra, Malay Peninsula and Borneo.

The epic literature the Malay Annals associates the etymological origin of "Melayu" to a small river named Sungai Melayu ('Melayu river') in Sumatra, Indonesia. The epic incorrectly stated that the river flowed to the Musi River in Palembang, while in reality it flowed to the Batang Hari River in Jambi. The term is thought to be derived from the Malay word melaju, a combination of the verbal prefix 'me' and the root word 'laju', meaning "to accelerate", used to describe the accelerating strong current of the river.

=== As a place name (toponym) ===
Prior to the 15th century, the term "Melayu" and its similar-sounding variants appear to apply as an old toponym to the Strait of Malacca region in general.

- Malaya Dwipa, "Malaya Dvipa", is described in chapter 48, Vayu Purana as one of the provinces in the eastern sea that was full of gold and silver. Some scholars equate the term with Sumatra, but several Indian scholars believe the term should refer to the mountainous Malay Peninsula, while Sumatra is more correctly associated with Suvarnadvipa.
- Maleu-kolon – a location in the Golden Chersonese or Malay Peninsula, from Ptolemy's 2nd-century work, Geographia.
- Mo-lo-yu – mentioned by Yijing, a Tang dynasty Chinese Buddhist monk who visited the Southeast Asia in 688–695. According to Yijing, the Mo-Lo-Yu kingdom was located at a distance of 15 days sailing from Bogha (Palembang), the capital of Sribhoga (Srivijaya). It took a 15-day sail as well to reach Ka-Cha (Kedah) from Mo-lo-yu; therefore, it can be reasoned that Mo-Lo-Yu would lie halfway between the two places. A popular theory relates Mo-Lo-Yu with the Jambi in Sumatra, however the geographical location of Jambi contradicts with Yi Jing's description of a "half way sail between Ka-Cha (Kedah) and Bogha (Palembang)". In the later Yuan dynasty (1271–1368) and Ming dynasty (1368–1644), the word Ma-La-Yu was mentioned often in Chinese historical texts – with changes in spelling due to the time span between the dynasties – to refer to a nation near the southern sea. Among the terms used was "Bôk-lá-yù", "Mók-là-yū" (木剌由), Má-lì-yù-er (麻里予兒), Oō-laì-yu (巫来由) — traced from the written source of monk Xuanzang) and Wú-laī-yû (無来由).
- Malaiyur – mentioned in the Tanjore inscription. It was described as a kingdom that had "a strong mountain for its rampart" that fell to the Chola invaders during Rajendra Chola I's campaign in the 11th century. It may have been situated in Sumatra, between Pannai and Srivijaya (Palembang), possibly in the Muaro Jambi archaeological site.
- Malai – mentioned by the 12th century Arab geographer Muhammad al-Idrisi in Tabula Rogeriana, it described the Malay peninsula as a long island and called it Malai, bordering the Qmer (Khmer) and lying 12 days sail from Sanf (Champa).
- Bhūmi Mālayu – (literally "Land of Malayu"), a transcription from Padang Roco Inscription dated 1286 CE by Slamet Muljana. The term is associated with Dharmasraya kingdom.
- Ma-li-yu-er – mentioned in the chronicle of Yuan dynasty, referring to a nation of the Malay Peninsula that faced the southward expansion of Sukhothai Kingdom, during the reign of Ram Khamhaeng. The chronicle stated: "..Animosity occurred between Siam and Ma-li-yu-er with both killing each other ...". In response to the Sukhothai's action, a Chinese envoy went to the Ram Khamhaeng's court in 1295 bearing an imperial decree: "Keep your promise and do no evil to Ma-li-yu-er".
- Malauir – mentioned in Marco Polo's account as a kingdom located in the Malay Peninsula, possibly similar to the one mentioned in Yuan chronicle.
- Malayapura – (literally "city of Malaya" or "fortress of Malaya"), inscribed on the Amoghapasa inscription dated 1347 CE. The term was used by Adityawarman to refer to Dharmasraya.

Other suggestions include the Javanese word mlayu (as a verb: to run, participle: fugitive), or the Malay term melaju (to steadily accelerate), referring to the high mobility and migratory nature of its people. De Barros (1552) mentioned that Iskandar Shah named the Malaios (Malays) so because of the banishment of his father from his country. Albuquerque explained that Parameswara fled (malayo) from the kingdom of Palembang to Malacca.

=== As an ethnic name (ethnonym) ===
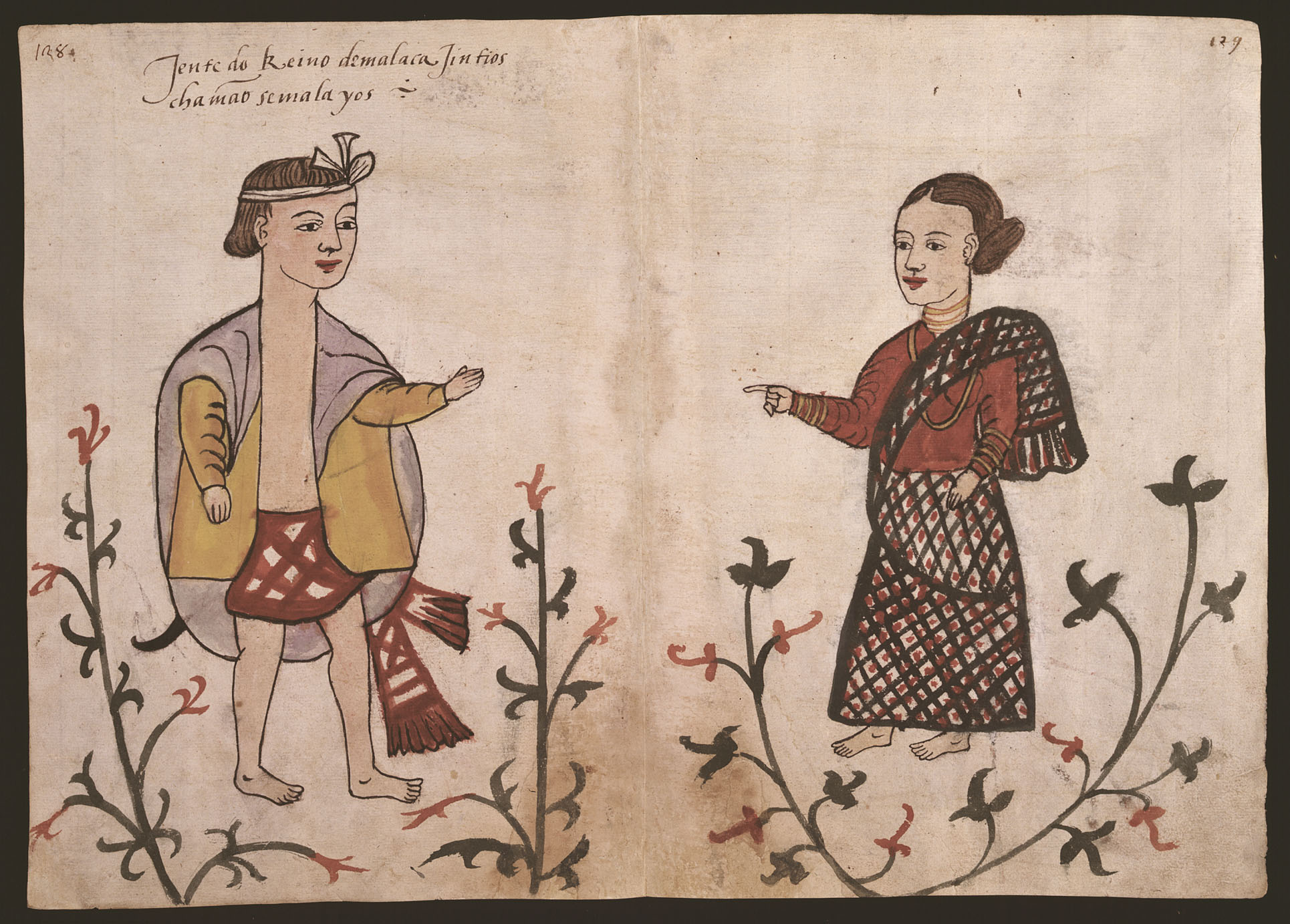
Portuguese watercolour of Malayan people of Malacca, circa 1540, featured in the Códice Casanatense

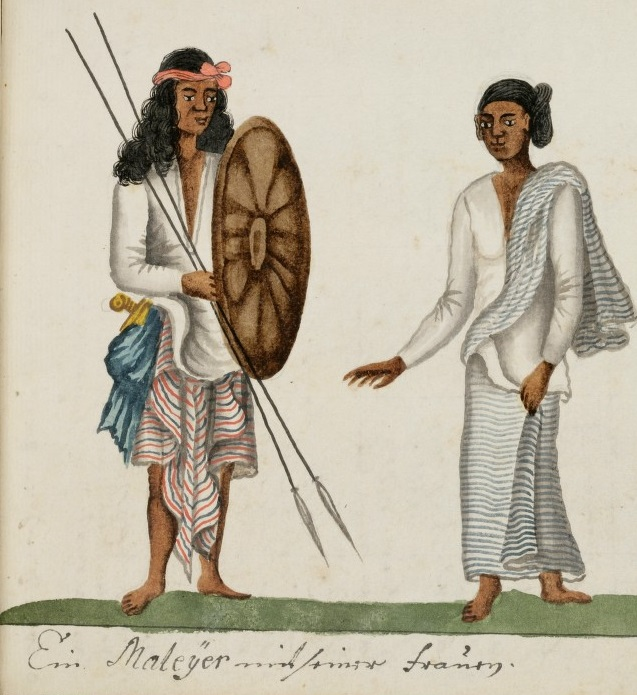
An illustration of a Malay couple, from Reise nach Batavia, between 1669 and 1682

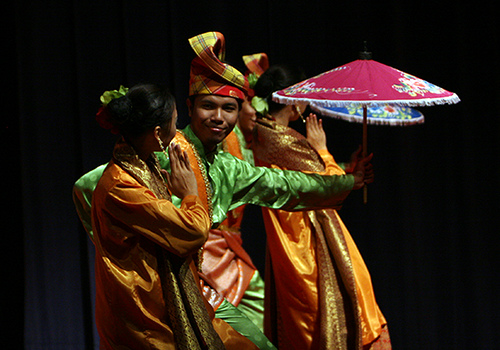
Joget dance from the Malacca Sultanate; many aspects of Malay culture are derived from the Malaccan court

The word "Melayu" as an ethnonym, to allude to a clearly different ethnological cluster, is assumed to have been made fashionable throughout the integration of the Malacca Sultanate as a regional power in the 15th century. It was applied to report the social partialities of the Malaccans as opposed to foreigners as of the similar area, especially the Javanese and Thais. This is evidenced from the early 16th century Malay word-list by Antonio Pigafetta (a participant in Magellan's circumnavigation), which referenced use of the phrase chiara Malaiu ('Malay ways') in maritime Southeast Asia to refer to the al parlare de Malaea (Italian for "to speak of Malacca").

According to historian Anthony Milner, classical Malay literature often described the Malays in a narrower sense than the modern interpretation; referring to the following texts as evidence of this view:

- The Hikayat Hang Tuah, written primarily during the 17th century, only identifies the Malay people as the subject of Malacca Sultanate;.
- The Hikayat Patani, composed from 1690–1730, reserves use of the term exclusively for Johor.
- The Hikayat Merong Mahawangsa (also known as the Kedah Annals), written in the late 18th or early 19th centuries, avoids using the descriptor "Malay" for the people of Kedah.
- The Hikayat Aceh, estimated to have been written sometime between 1636 and 1700, explicitly linked Malay ethnicity to Johor, but did not do the same when referring to Aceh or Deli.

However, Milner notes, these works have been subjected to numerous edits over time by a variety of copyists, which may have included the introduction or enhancement of the concept of a "Malay" identity; one copy of the Malay Annals, for example, features a chief in Palembang referring to "my descendants", whereas a later copy reads "Malay subjects".

== Origins ==
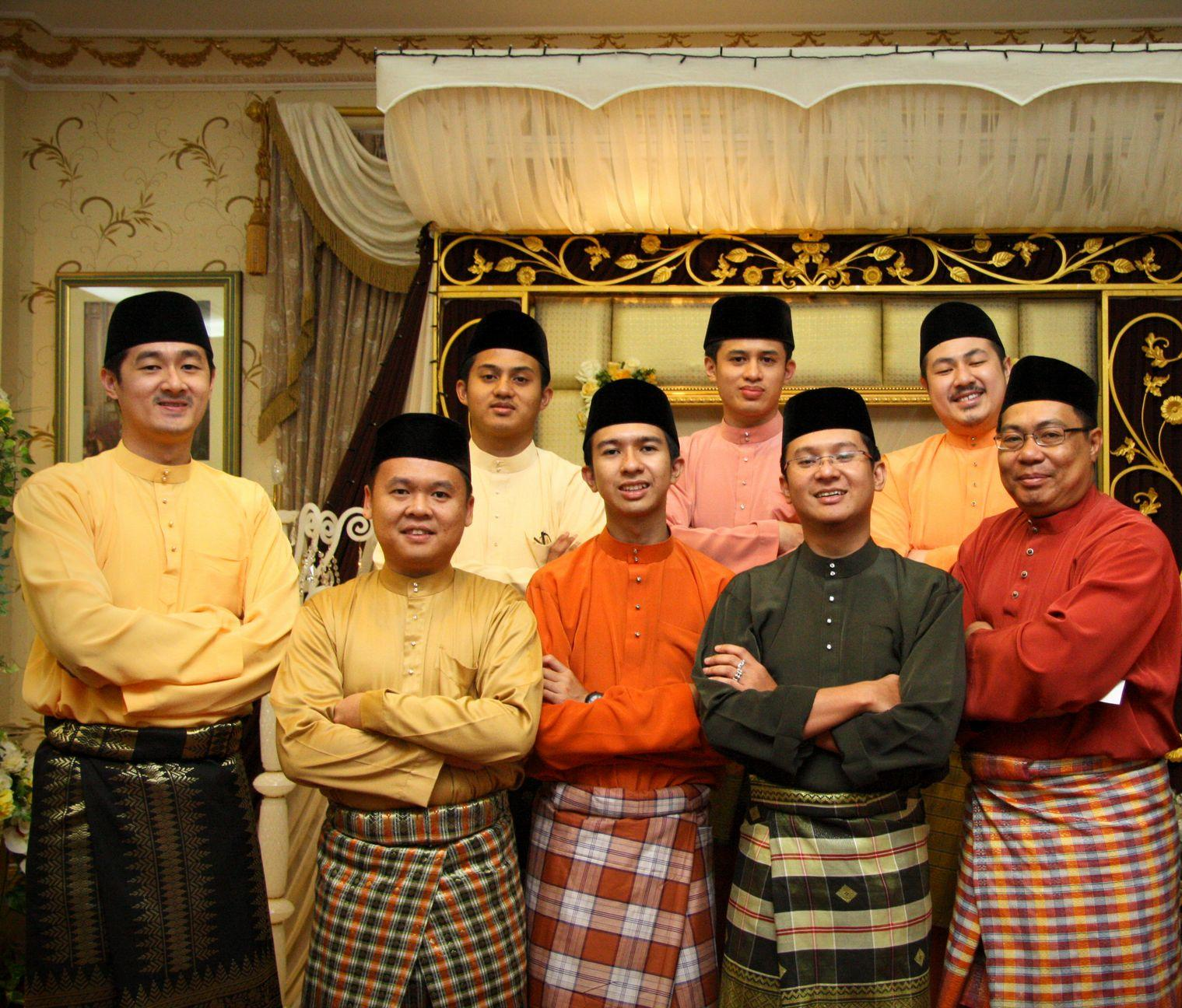
A group of men from Brunei Darussalam in the Cekak Musang type, worn together with the songket (far left) and kain sarong

=== Proto-Malay models ===
Also known as Melayu asli (aboriginal Malays) or Melayu purba (ancient Malays), the Proto-Malays are of Austronesian origin and thought to have migrated to the Malay Archipelago in a long series of migrations between 2500 and 1500 BCE. Notable Proto-Malays of today are Moken, Jakun, Orang Kuala, Temuan and Orang Kanaq. The Encyclopedia of Malaysia: Early History, has pointed out a total of three theories of the origin of Malays:

- The Yunnan theory (published in 1889) – The theory of Proto-Malays originating from Yunnan approximately 4,000 to 6,000 years ago. The theory is supported by R.H Geldern and his team who theorised that their migration occurred from the Mekong River to the Malay Peninsula. Other evidence that supports this theory includes stone tools found in the Malay Archipelago being analogous to Central Asian tools, which shows the similarity of Malay and Assamese customs.
- The New Guinea/Seafarers theory (published in 1965) – The migration of seafarers with strong oceanographic skills who travelled from island to island between New Zealand and Madagascar. The theory claims the Malay's morphology at the time were similar to that of Negroids.
- The Taiwan theory (published in 1997) – The migration of a group of people from Southern China occurred 6,000 years ago, some moved to Taiwan (today's Taiwanese aborigines are their descendants), then to the Philippines and later to Borneo (roughly 4,500 years ago) (today's Dayak and other groups). These ancient people also split with some heading to Sulawesi and others progressing into Java, and Sumatra, all of which now speak languages that belong to the Austronesian Language family. The final migration was to the Malay Peninsula roughly 3,000 years ago. A sub-group from Borneo moved to Champa in modern-day Central and South Vietnam roughly 4,500 years ago. There are also traces of the Dong Son and Hoabinhian migration from Vietnam and Cambodia. All these groups share DNA and linguistic origins traceable to the island that is today Taiwan, and the ancestors of these ancient people are traceable to southern China.

==== Deutero-Malays ====
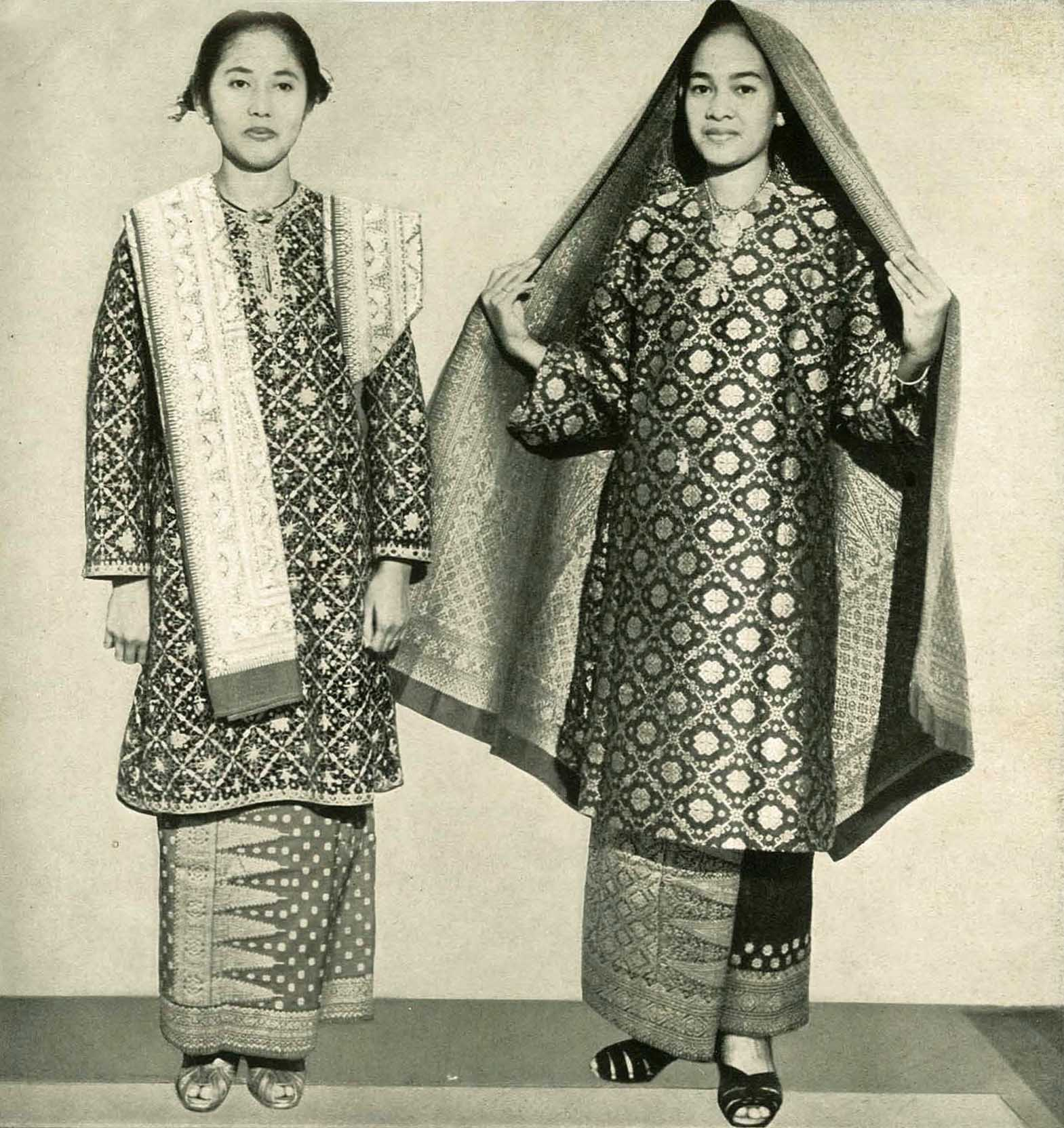
Ladies from Palembang clad in their traditional attire, known as Baju Kurung made from Songket. The dress is commonly associated with women of Malay extraction.

The Deutero-Malays are an Iron Age people descended partly from the subsequent Austronesian peoples who came equipped with more advanced farming techniques and new knowledge of metals. The Deutero-Malay settlers were not nomadic like their predecessors: instead they settled and established kampungs which serve as the main units in society. These kampungs were normally situated on the riverbanks or coastal areas and generally self-sufficient in food and other necessities. By the end of the 1st century BCE, these kampungs were beginning to engage in some trade with the outside world. The Deutero-Malays are considered the direct ancestors of the present-day Malay people.

==== Expansion from Sundaland model ====
A more recent theory holds that rather than being populated by expansion from the mainland, the Ice Age populations of the Malay Peninsula, neighbouring Indonesian Archipelago, and the then-exposed continental shelf (Sundaland) instead developed locally from the first human settlers and expanded to the mainland. Proponents of this theory hold that this expansion gives a far more parsimonious explanation of the linguistic, archaeological, and anthropological evidence than earlier models, particularly the Taiwan model. This theory also draws support from recent genetic evidence by Human Genome Organisation suggesting that the primary peopling of Asia occurred in a single migration through Southeast Asia; this route is held to be the modern Malay area and that the diversity in the area developed mainly in-place without requiring major migrations from the mainland. The expansion itself may have been driven by rising sea levels at the end of the Ice Age.

Proponent Stephen Oppenheimer has further theorised that the expansion of peoples occurred in three rapid surges due to rising sea levels at the end of the Ice Age, and that this diaspora spread the peoples and their associated cultures, myths, and technologies not just to mainland Southeast Asia, but as far as India, the Near East, and the Mediterranean. Reviewers have found his proposals for the original settlement and dispersal worthy of further study, but have been sceptical of his more diffusionist claims.

=== Genetic evidence ===
Malays are an Austronesian-speaking ethnic group of Insular Southeast Asia, and the Malay Peninsula. According to a 2015 study, Malays from Peninsular Malaysia, Singapore, Indonesia and Sri Lanka have 4 major ancestral components, including Austronesian (17%–62%), Proto-Malay (15%–31%), East Asian (4%–16%) and South Asian (3%–34%). But the Austronesian and Southeast Asian aboriginal components were more significant for Malays from Peninsular Malaysia, Singapore and Indonesia than East Asian and South Asian. In contrast, Malays from Sri Lanka possessed about 34% South Asian ancestry in their genetic makeup, making them relatively distinct.

A study in 2021 concluded that a distinctive Basal-East Asian lineage (sometimes termed as 'East- and Southeast Asian lineage' (ESEA), which is ancestral to modern East and Southeast Asians, Polynesians, and Siberians, originated in Mainland Southeast Asia at ~50,000 BCE, and expanded through multiple migration waves southwards and northwards respectively. Basal-East Asian ancestry, as well as later Austroasiatic-associated ancestry, spread into Maritime Southeast Asia prior to the Austronesian expansion. Austronesian-speakers themselves are suggested to have arrived on Taiwan and the northern Philippines between 10,000 and 7,000 BCE from coastal southern China, and spread from there throughout Insular Southeast Asia. The authors concluded that the Austronesian expansion into Insular Southeast Asia and Polynesia was outgoing from the Philippines rather than Taiwan, and that modern Austronesian-speaking peoples, such as the Malays, have largely ancestry from the earliest Basal-East Asians, Austroasiatic migrants from Mainland Southeast Asia, and Austronesian-speaking seafarers from the Philippines, without much admixture from previous groups.

A 2026 study stated that Malays were genetically closer to East Asians than to the indigenous inhabitants of the Malay Peninsula. They have a 'consistent' genetic profile consisting of East Asian (58%), North Bornean-related Austronesian (24%) and indigenous Semang-related (11%) ancestries. Gene flow between Malays and South Asians was also detected.

== History ==
=== Indian influence ===
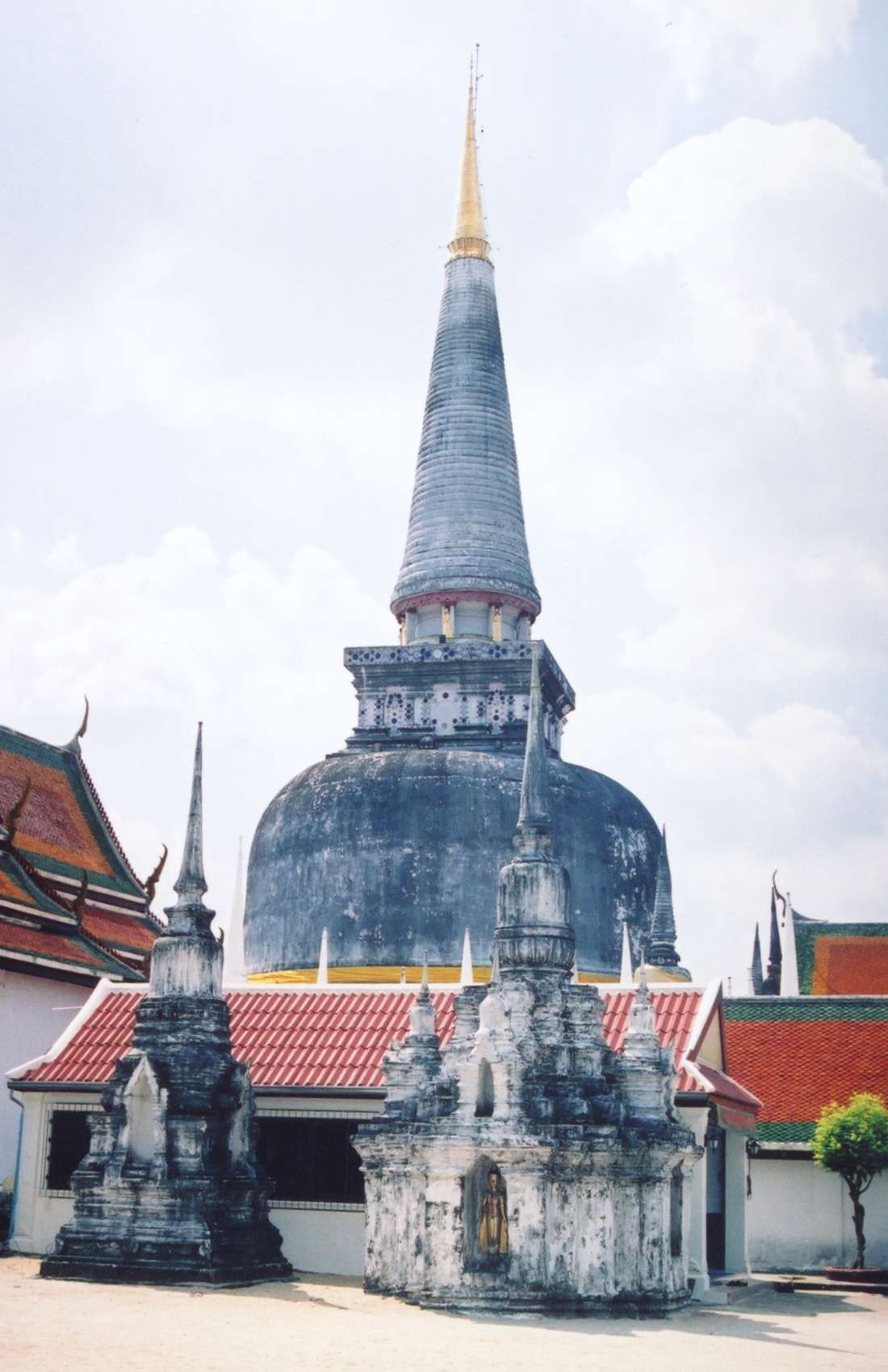
Chedi Phra Borommathat, a stupa located in Nakhon Si Thammarat, Thailand. The temple witnessed the rise and fall of Tambralinga, a powerful Buddhist kingdom that managed to conquer Jaffna kingdom in Sri Lanka.

There is no definite evidence which dates the first Indian voyages across the Bay of Bengal but conservative estimates place the earliest arrivals on Malay shores at least 2,000 years ago. The discovery of jetty remains, iron smelting sites, and a clay brick monument dating back to 110 CE in the Bujang Valley, shows that a maritime trading route with South Indian Tamil kingdoms was already established since the second century.

The growth of trade with India brought coastal people in much of maritime Southeast Asia into contact with the major religions of Hinduism and Buddhism. Throughout this area a most profound in influence has been exerted by India which seems to have introduced into it architecture, sculpture, writing, monarchy, religion, iron, cotton and a host of elements of higher culture. Indian religions, cultural traditions and Sanskrit began to spread across the land. Hindu temples were built in the Indian style, local kings began referring to themselves as "raja" and more desirable aspects of Indian government were adopted.

The beginning of the Common Era saw the rise of Malay states in the coastal areas of the Sumatra and Malay Peninsula; Srivijaya, Nakhon Si Thammarat Kingdom, Gangga Negara, Langkasuka, Kedah, Pahang, the Melayu Kingdom and Chi Tu. Between the 7th and 13th centuries, many of these small, often prosperous peninsula and Sumatran maritime trading states, became part of the mandala of Srivijaya, a great confederation of city-states centred in Sumatra. Early during this period, the earliest known mention of the word "Malayu" was used in Chinese sources in 644 CE. Later in the mid-14th century, the word Malay was already recognised as a collective people sharing similar lineage, culture and lingua.

Srivijaya's influence spread over all the coastal areas of Sumatra and the Malay Peninsula, western Java and western Borneo, as well as the rest of the Malay Archipelago. Enjoying both Indian and Chinese patronage, its wealth was gained mostly through trade. At its height, the Old Malay language was used as its official language and became the lingua franca of the region, replacing Sanskrit, the language of Hinduism. The Srivijayan era is considered the golden age of Malay culture.

The glory of Srivijaya however began to drastically wane after the series of raids by the Tamil Chola dynasty in the 11th century. After the fall of Srivijaya in 1025 CE, the Melayu kingdom of Jambi in Sumatra, became the most dominant Malay state of the region. By the end of the 13th century, the remnants of the Malay empire in Sumatra was finally destroyed by the Javanese invaders during the Pamalayu expedition (Pamalayu means "war against the Malays").

In 1299, through the support of the loyal servants of the empire, the Orang laut, a Malay prince of Palembang origin, Sang Nila Utama established the Kingdom of Singapura in Temasek. His dynasty ruled the island kingdom until the end of the 14th century, when the Malay polity once again faced the wrath of Javanese invaders. In 1400, his great-great-grandson, Parameswara, headed north and established the Malacca Sultanate. The new kingdom succeeded Srivijaya and inherited much of the royal and cultural traditions, including a large part of the territories of its predecessor in Palembang.

The timeline of Srivijayan expansion from Palembang between the 7th and 13th centuries; the state would subsequently be known as Melayu Kingdom before its demise. By the 14th century, a Palembangese-born prince, Parameswara, would later establish the Kingdom of Malacca, bringing the old Palembangese courts traditions and identity into the newfound state.

In the north of the peninsula, the power vacuum left by the collapse of Srivijaya was filled by the growth of the kingdom of Tambralinga in the 12th century. Between the 13th and early 14th centuries, the kingdom succeeded to incorporate most of the Malay Peninsula under its mandala. The campaign led by Chandrabhanu Sridhamaraja (1230–1263) managed to capture Jaffna kingdom in Sri Lanka between 1247 and 1258. He was eventually defeated by the forces of the Pandyan dynasty from Tamil Nadu in 1263 and was killed by the brother of Emperor Sadayavarman Sundara Pandyan I. The invasion marked an unrivaled feature in the history of Southeast Asia, it was the only time there was an armed maritime expedition far beyond the boundaries of the region.

The cultivation of Malay polity system also diffused beyond the proper Sumatran-Peninsular border during this era. The age avowed by exploration and migration of the Malays to establish kingdoms beyond the traditional Srivijayan realm. Several exemplification are the enthronement of a Tambralingan prince to reign the Lavo Kingdom in present-day Central Thailand and the establishment of the Tanjungpura Kingdom in what is now West Kalimantan, Borneo.

=== Islamisation ===
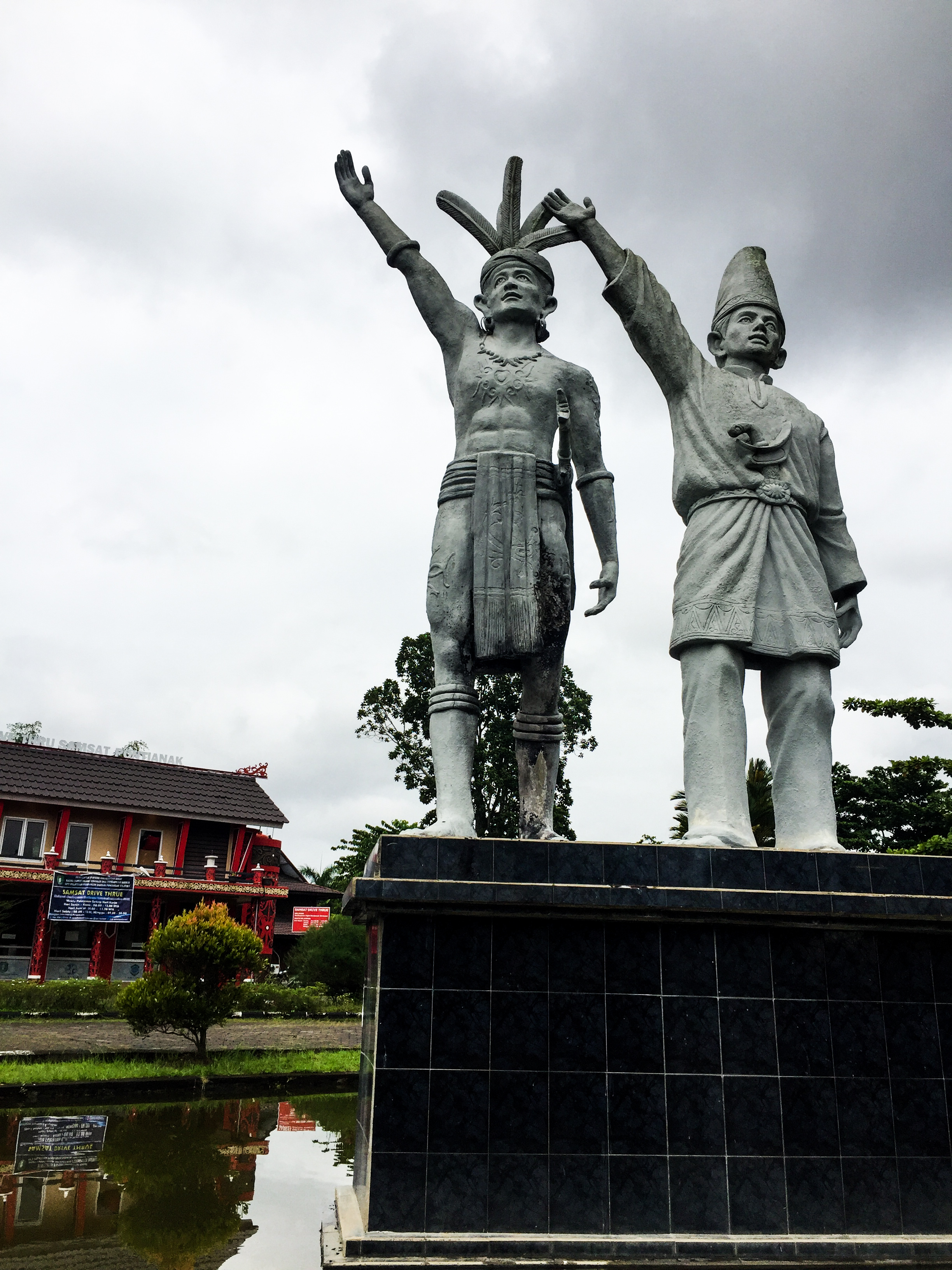
The "Dayak-Malay" brotherhood monument in West Kalimantan Provincial Museum, Pontianak, Indonesia

The period of the 11th until 15th centuries saw the arrival of Islam and the rise of the great port-city of Malacca on the southwestern coast of the Malay Peninsula — two major developments that altered the course of Malay history.

The Islamic faith arrived on the shores of what are now the states of Kedah, Perak, Kelantan and Terengganu, from the beginning of 12th century. The earliest archaeological evidence of Islam from the Malay Peninsula is the Terengganu Inscription Stone dating from the 14th century found in Terengganu state, Malaysia. Islam became a defining component of Malay identity from the 13th century onward, and its development in the region was historically shaped by trade, scholarship, and interactions with diverse communities across Southeast Asia.

By the 15th century, the Malacca Sultanate, whose hegemony reached over much of the western Malay Archipelago, had become the centre of Islamisation in the east. As a Malaccan state religion, Islam brought many great transformation into the Malaccan society and culture, and It became the primary instrument in the evolution of a classical Malay identity. The Malaccan era witnessed the close association of Islam with Malay society and how it developed into a definitive marker of Malay identity. Over time, this common Malay cultural idiom came to characterise much of the Malay Archipelago through the Malayisation process. The expansion of Malaccan influence through trade and Dawah brought with it together the Classical Malay language, the Islamic faith, and the Malay Muslim culture; the three core values of Kemelayuan ("Malayness").

In 1511, the Malaccan capital fell into the hands of Portuguese conquistadors. However, Malacca remained an institutional prototype: a paradigm of statecraft and a point of cultural reference for successor states such as Johor Sultanate (1528–present), Perak Sultanate (1528–present), Pahang Sultanate (1470–present), Siak Sri Indrapura Sultanate (1725–1946), Pelalawan Sultanate (1725–1946) and Riau-Lingga Sultanate (1824–1911).

The extent of the Malaccan Sultanate in the 15th century, the legacy of the Malaccan court can be strongly witnessed in the construction of the Malay sociocultural framework until today.

Across the South China Sea in the 14th century, another Malay realm, the Bruneian Empire was on the rise to become the most powerful polity in Borneo. By the middle of the 15th century, Brunei entered into a close relationship with the Malacca Sultanate. The sultan married a Malaccan princess, adopted Islam as the court religion, and introduced an efficient administration modelled on Malacca. Brunei profited from trade with Malacca but gained even greater prosperity after the great Malay port was conquered by the Portuguese in 1511. It reached its golden age in the mid-16th century when it controlled land as far south as present day Kuching in Sarawak, north towards the Philippine Archipelago. The empire broadened its influence in Luzon by defeating Datu Gambang of the Kingdom of Tondo and by founding a satellite state, Kota Seludong in present-day Manila, setting up the Muslim Rajah, Rajah Sulaiman I as a vassal to the Sultanate of Brunei. Brunei also expanded its influence in Mindanao, Philippines when Sultan Bolkiah married Leila Macanai, the daughter of the Sultan of Sulu. However, states like the kingdom of Pangasinan, Rajahnate of Cebu and Kedatuan of Madja-as tried to resist Brunei's and Islam's spread into the Philippines. Brunei's fairly loose river based governmental presence in Borneo projected the process of Malayisation.

Other significant Malay sultanates were the Kedah Sultanate (1136–present), Kelantan Sultanate (1411–present), Patani Sultanate (1516–1771), Reman Kingdom (1785–1909) and Legeh Kingdom (1755–1902) that dominated the northern part of the Malay Peninsula. Jambi Sultanate (1460–1907), Palembang Sultanate (1550–1823) and Indragiri Sultanate (1298–1945) controlled much of the southeastern shores of Sumatra. Deli Sultanate (1632–1946), Serdang Sultanate (1728–1948), Langkat Sultanate (1568–1948) and Asahan Sultanate (1630–1948) governed eastern Sumatra. While West Borneo observed the rise of Pontianak Sultanate (1771–1950), Mempawah Sultanate (1740–1950) and Matan Sultanate (1590–1948), Sanggau Sultanate, Sintang Sultanate, and Sekadau Sultanate.

=== Colonisation by foreign powers ===
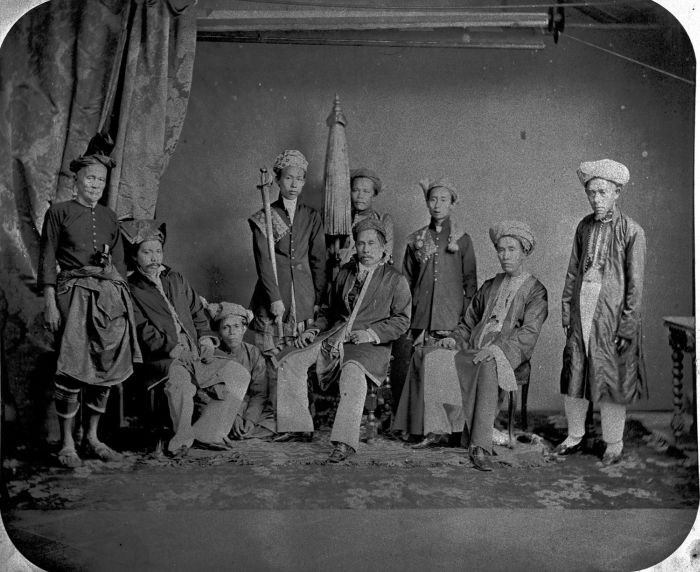
The reigning elite of the Riau-Lingga Sultanate in 1867, predominantly of Bugis-Malay descent. The sultanate would be abolished almost half a century later in 1911 by the Dutch powers, following its strong independence movement against the colonial government.

Between 1511 and 1984, numerous Malay kingdoms and sultanates fell under direct colonisation or became the protectorates of different foreign powers, from European colonial powers like Portuguese, Dutch and British, to regional powers like Aceh, Siam and Japan. In 1511, the Portuguese Empire captured the capital city of the Malacca Sultanate. The victorious Portuguese however, were unable to extend their political influence beyond the fort of Malacca. The Sultan maintained his overlordship on the lands outside Malacca and established the Johor Sultanate in 1528 to succeed Malacca. Portuguese Malacca faced several unsuccessful retaliation attacks by Johor until 1614, when the combined forces of Johor and the Dutch Empire, ousted the Portuguese from the peninsula. As per agreement with Johor in 1606, the Dutch later took control of Malacca.

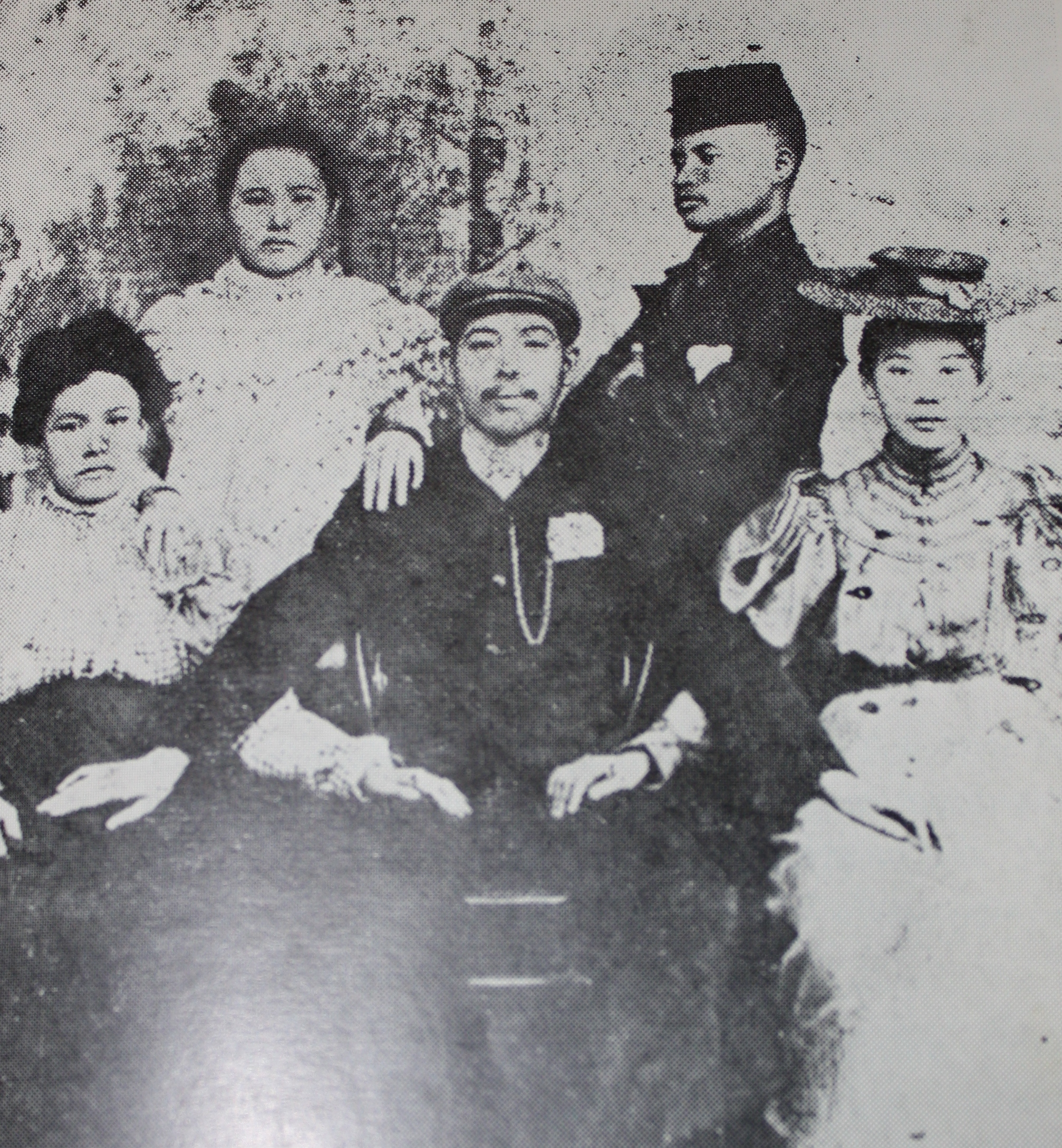
Tuan Lebeh (seated, in the middle), the Long Raya or Raja Muda (crown prince) of the Kingdom of Reman in 1899. The State of Reman was abolished by the Rattanakosin Kingdom alongside various other Patani Malay kingdoms that revolted for independence in the early 1902 including Pattani, Saiburi, Nongchik, Yaring, Yala, Legeh and Teluban.

Historically, Malay states of the peninsula had hostile relations with the Siamese. The Malacca Sultanate Itself fought two wars with the Siamese while the northern Malay states came intermittently under Siamese dominance for centuries. In 1771, the Kingdom of Siam under the new Chakri dynasty abolished the Patani Sultanate and later annexed a large part of Kedah Sultanate. Earlier, the Siamese under Ayutthaya Kingdom have had already absorbed Tambralinga and overrun the Singgora Sultanate in the 17th century. Between 1808 and 1813, the Siamese imposed a new administrative structure and created the semi-independent Malay kingdoms of Patani, Saiburi, Nongchik, Yaring, Yala, Reman and Rangae from Greater Patani and similarly obtained Rundung, Kupa, Tongkah, Terang while carving Setul, Langu, Perlis, Kubang Pasu from the Kedah Kingdom in 1839. In 1902, the Siamese stripped the political powers of all the 7 kingdoms of Patani following a planned revolt for independence against the central government. The coup de grâce was cultivated by 1906, when the Siamese redraw the border of the Patani territories and installed a new governance and administrative system.

In 1786, the island of Penang was leased to East India Company by Kedah Sultanate in exchange of military assistance against the Siamese. In 1819, the company also acquired Singapore from Johor Empire, later in 1824, Dutch Malacca from the Dutch, followed by Dindings from Perak by 1874 and finally Labuan from Brunei in 1886. All these trading posts officially known as Straits Settlements in 1826 and became the crown colony of British Empire in 1867. Additionally, the Straits Settlements would also encompass the Indian Ocean islands of Christmas Island and the Cocos Islands in 1886. British intervention in the affairs of Malay states was formalised in 1895, when Malay rulers accepted British Residents in administration, and the Federated Malay States was formed. In 1909, Kedah, Kelantan, Terengganu and Perlis were handed over by Siam to the British. These states along with Johor, later became known as Unfederated Malay States. During the World War II, all these British possessions and protectorates that collectively known as British Malaya were occupied by the Empire of Japan.

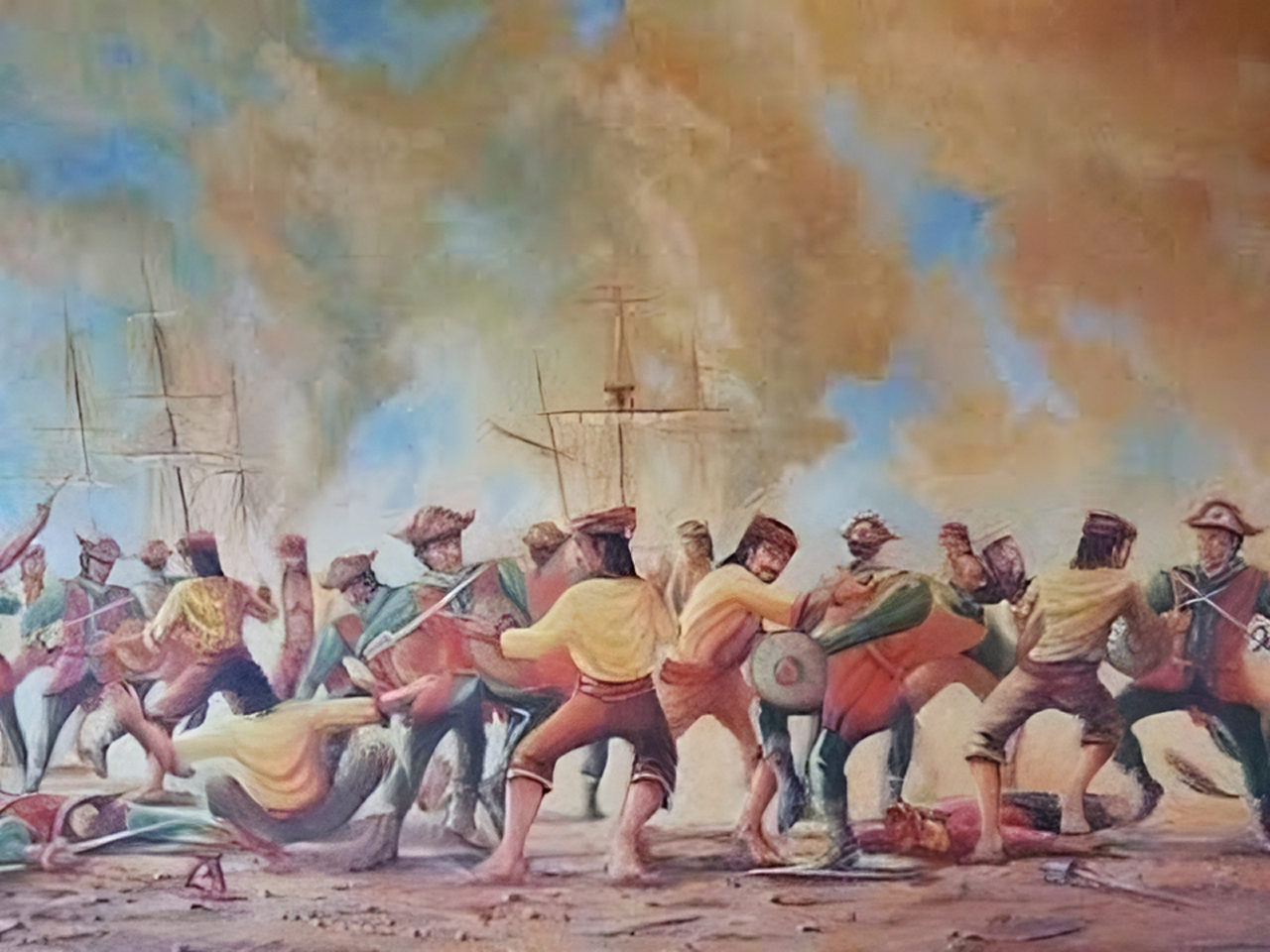
Scene from the Castilian War (1578–1580) as Brunei defended its sovereignty against European expansion

The twilight of the vast Bruneian Empire began during the Castille War against the Spanish conquistadors who arrived in the Philippines from Mexico. The war resulted in the end of the empire's dominance in the present-day Philippine Archipelago. The decline further culminated in the 19th century, when the Sultanate lost most of its remaining territories in Borneo to the White Rajahs of Sarawak, North Borneo Chartered Company and its lower Borneo vassals to Dutch East India Company. Brunei was a British protectorate from 1888 to 1984.

Following the Anglo-Dutch Treaty of 1824 which divided the Malay Archipelago into a British zone in the north and a Dutch zone in the south, all Malay sultanates in Sumatra and Southern Borneo became part of the Dutch East Indies. Though some of Malay sultans maintain their power under Dutch control, some were abolished by the Dutch government under the accusation of retaliation against the colonial rule, like the case of Palembang Sultanate in 1823, Jambi Sultanate in 1906 and Riau Sultanate in 1911.

In the late 19th century, Germany sought to establish a naval base in Langkawi, requesting its lease from Siam, influenced by Grand Admiral Alfred von Tirpitz's vision of using the island as a hub for a global submarine cable network. With its deep natural harbour, Langkawi was strategically positioned between German territories in China and the Pacific, facilitating warship restocking and enhancing commercial interests for German investors. In October 1899, Behn, Meyer & Co approached Kedah's Crown Prince to lease the island for 50 years, but the plan faltered due to Siam's refusal, as dictated by the Secret Siamese Treaty of 1897, which required British consent for territorial concessions. A subsequent attempt in 1900 to acquire Pulau Lontar was similarly dismissed, prompting British concerns over potential German expansion in the region and its implications for their economic and political dominance.

The prospect of a German annexation of the northern peninsula and the potential of its involvement for a commercial canal or railway network across the Isthmus of Kra, posed a serious threat to the British economic interest and political dominance in the region. Severely alarmed, the British and the Siamese entered the Anglo-Siamese Treaty of 1909, partitioning the peninsula between the British and the Siamese jurisdiction.

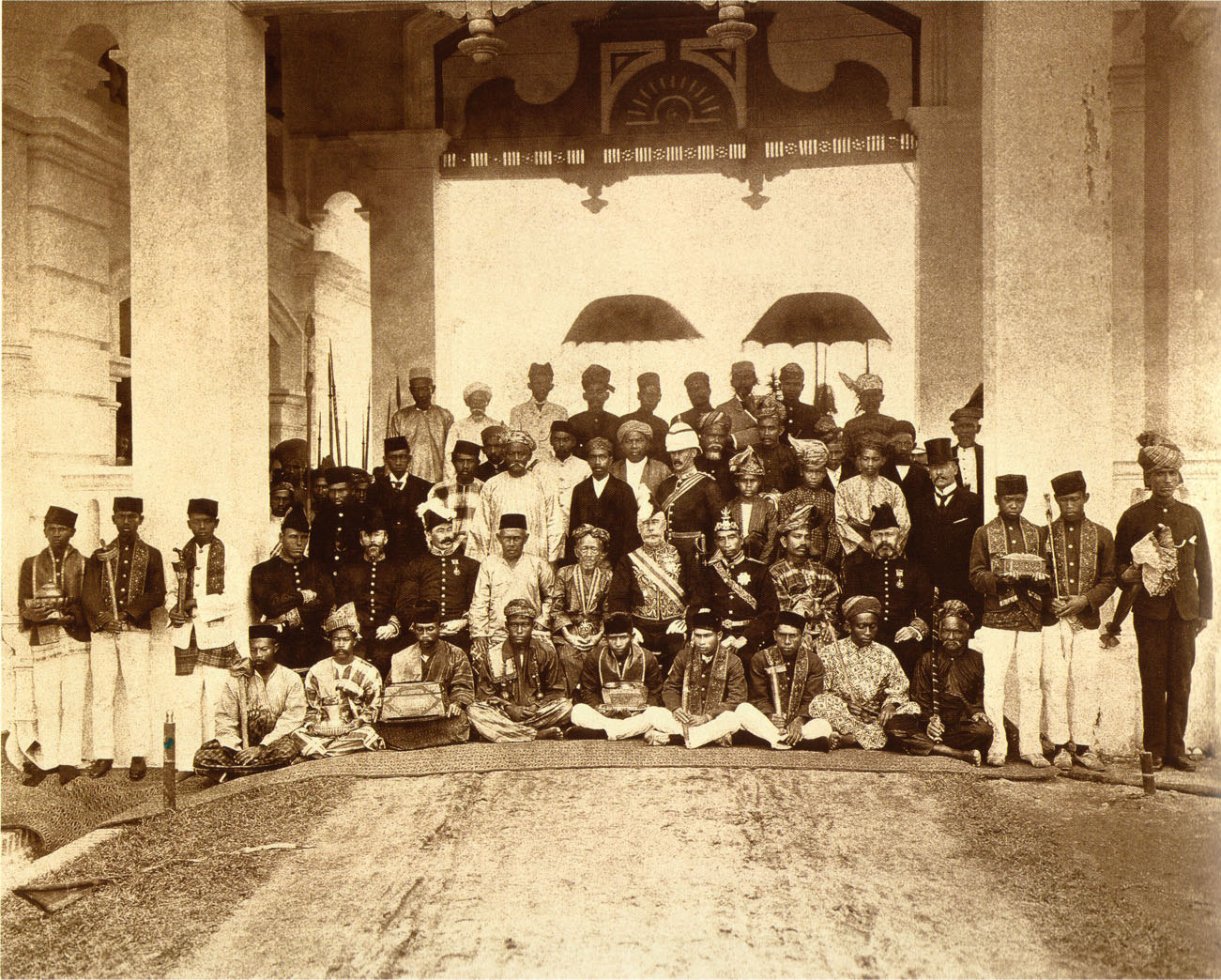
The Malay Rulers and nobilities of Negeri Sembilan, Pahang, Perak and Selangor with British colonial officers during the first Durbar in Istana Negara, Kuala Kangsar, Perak, Federated Malay States, 1897

The Anglo-Siamese Treaty attested that the Siamese to control the upper portion of the peninsular while the lower region was to be held under the British dominance. The British originally planned for the inclusion of Reman, Legeh and Setul under their dominion together with a cluster of northern Malay states. Nonetheless, they only managed to secure Kedah, Kelantan, Terengganu and Perlis under the agreement. The treaty also witnessed the state of Kedah being reduced the most, with Tarutao, Butang islands groups, Sendawa, Langgu and the principality of Setul were all being divorced into the Siamese hands, a similar fate was also followed in northeastern coast of Kelantan that was demanded to renounced their right on the Tabal district, including Sungai Golok and Sungai Padi; while Perlis lost its Pujoh district. Then-British controlled Federated Malay State of Perak however, saw an enlargement of their land area, with southern territories of Reman being transferred into the state and additionally Kelantan received Jeli from Legeh (which had been under Siamese jurisdiction since 1902). The Siamese then abdicated Tunku Baharuddin, the King of Setul, the sole Malay kingdom remained under Siamese territory in 1916. The treaty nonetheless, manage to seal the fate of the Malay states of Kedah, Kelantan, Terengganu and Perlis to retain a degree of their sovereign powers under the British colonial government, a legacy that can be witnessed today in the Malaysian administrative system.

Later during the Japanese occupation of the Dutch East Indies, British Malaya and Borneo, the Japanese maintained a favourable relationship with the Sultans and other Malay leaders, this is partially composed to foster the trust of the Malay public that was generally loyal towards the sultan. Nonetheless, in a series of massacres known as Pontianak incidents, the Japanese assassinated virtually all of the West Kalimantan Malay sultans, including a large numbers of Malay intelligentsias after they have been falsely accused of planning an uprising and coup d'etat against the Japanese. It was believed that West Kalimantan took two generations to recover from the near-total collapse of the Malay ruling class in the territory.

=== Malay nationalism ===
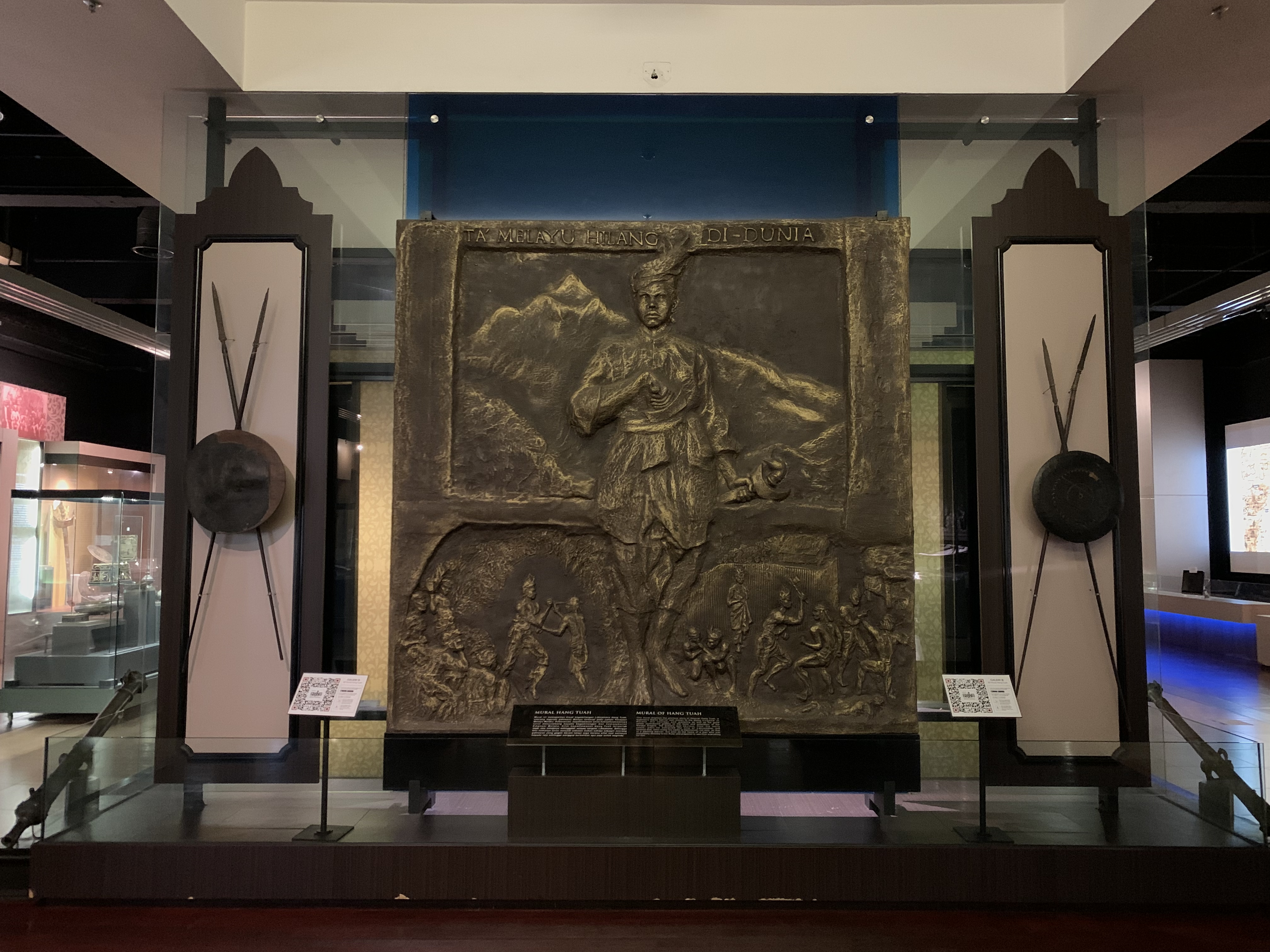
The bronze mural of the legendary Malay warrior, Hang Tuah with his renowned quote Ta' Melayu Hilang Di-Dunia (Malay for "Never shall the Malays vanish from the face of the earth") written on the top. The quote is a famous rallying cry for Malay nationalism.

Despite the widespread distribution of the Malay population throughout the Malay Archipelago, modern Malay nationalism was only significantly mobilised in the early twentieth century British Malaya i. e. the Malay Peninsula. In the Netherlands Indies, the struggle against colonisation was characterised by the trans-ethnic nationalism: the so-called "Indonesian National Awakening" united people from the various parts of the Dutch colony in the development of a national consciousness as "Indonesians". In Brunei, despite some attempt made to arouse Malay political consciousness between 1942 and 1945, there was no significant history of ethnic-based nationalism. In Thailand however, Pattani separatism against Thai rule is regarded by some historians as a part of the wider sphere of peninsular Malay nationalism. A similar secession movement can be witnessed in modern-day Indonesia, where both autochthonously-Malay provinces of Riau and Riau Islands sought to gain independence under the name of Republic of Riau. Nevertheless, what follows is specific to the peninsula Malay nationalism that resulted in the formation of the Federation of Malaya, later reconstituted as Malaysia.

The earliest and most influential instruments of Malay national awakening were the periodicals which politicised the position of the Malays in the face of colonialism and alien immigration of non-Malays. In spite of repressions imposed by the British colonial government, there were no less than 147 journals and newspapers published in Malaya between 1876 and 1941. Among notable periodicals were Al-Imam (1906), Pengasuh (1920), Majlis (1935) and Utusan Melayu (1939). The rise of Malay nationalism was largely mobilised by three nationalist factions – the radicals distinguishable into the Malay left and the Islamic group which were both opposed to the conservative elites.

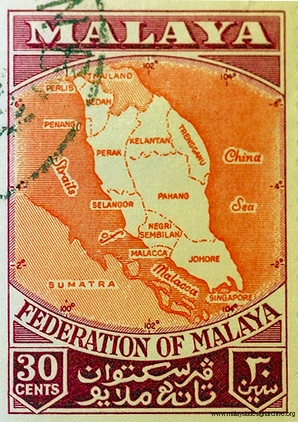
Federation of Malaya's commemorative stamp issued in 1957. The semi-independent federation was formed in 1948 from nine Malay states and two British Straits Settlements. It achieved independence in 1957.

The Malay leftists were represented by Kesatuan Melayu Muda, formed in 1938 by a group of Malay intelligentsia primarily educated in Sultan Idris Training College, with an ideal of Greater Indonesia. In 1945, they reorganised themselves into a political party known as Partai Kebangsaan Melayu Malaya (PKMM). The Islamists were originally represented by Kaum Muda consisted of Middle east – educated scholars with Pan-Islamic sentiment. The first Islamic political party was Partai Orang Muslimin Malaya (Hizbul Muslimin) formed in March 1948, later succeeded by Pan-Malayan Islamic Party in 1951. The third group was the conservatives consisted of the westernised elites who were bureaucrats and members of royal families that shared a common English education mostly at the exclusive Malay College Kuala Kangsar. They formed voluntary organisations known as Persatuan Melayu ('Malay Associations') in various parts of the country with the primary goals of advancing and protecting the interests of Malays. In March 1946, 41 of these Malay associations formed United Malays National Organisation (UMNO), to assert Malay dominance over Malaya.

The Malay and Malayness has been the fundamental basis for Malay ideology and Malay nationalism in Malaysia. All three Malay nationalist factions believed in the idea of a Bangsa Melayu ('Malay Nation') and the position of Malay language, but disagreed over the role of Islam and Malay rulers. The conservatives supported Malay language, Islam and Malay monarchy as constituting the key pillars of Malayness, but within a secular state that restricted the political role of Islam. The leftists concurred with the secular state but wanted to end feudalism, whereas the Islamic group favoured ending royalty but sought a much larger role of Islam.

Since the foundation of the Republic of Indonesia as a unitary state in 1950, all traditional Malay monarchies in Indonesia were abolished, and the Sultans positions reduced to titular heads or pretenders. The violent demise of the sultanates of Deli, Langkat, Serdang, Asahan and other Malay principalities in East Sumatra during the "Social revolution" of 1946 orchestrated by the Communist Party of Indonesia, drastically influenced their Malayan counterparts and politically motivating them against the PKMM's ideal of Greater Indonesia and the Islamists' vision of Islamic Republic.

In March 1946, UMNO emerged with the full support of the Malay sultans from the Conference of Rulers. The new movement forged a close political link between rulers and subjects never before achieved. It generated an excited Malay public opinion which, together with the surprising political apathy of the non-Malays, led to Britain's abandonment of the radical Malayan Union plan. By July, UMNO succeeded in obtaining an agreement with the British to begin negotiations for a new constitution. Negotiations continued from August to November, between British officials on the one hand, and the Sultans' representatives and UMNO and the other.

Two years later the semi independent Federation of Malaya was born. The new constitutional arrangement largely reverted to the basic pattern of pre-war colonial rule and built on the supremacy of the individual Malay states. Malay rights and privileges were safeguarded. The traditional Malay rulers thus retained their prerogatives, while their English-educated descendants came to occupy positions of authority at the centre, which was being progressively decolonised. In August 1957, the Federation of Malaya, the West's last major dependency in Southeast Asia, attained independence in a peaceful transfer of power. The federation was reconstituted as Malaysia with the addition in 1963 of Singapore (separated in 1965), Sabah and Sarawak.

== Culture ==
=== Language ===
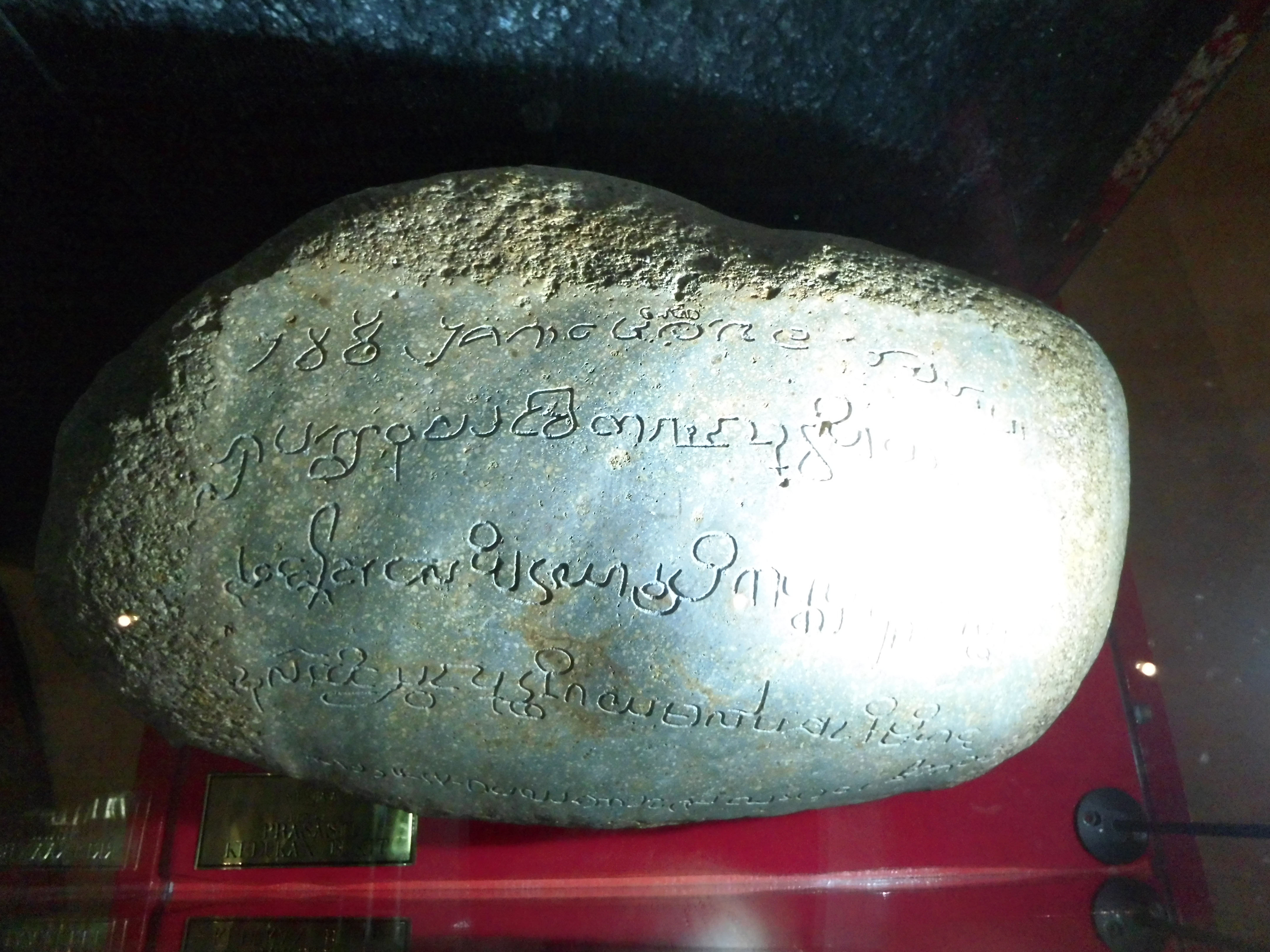
The Kedukan Bukit Inscription written in Pallava script. Dating back from 683, it is one of the oldest surviving Malay written artefact.

The Malay language is one of the most prominent languages of the world, especially of the Austronesian family. Variants and dialects of Malay are used as an official language in Brunei, Malaysia, Indonesia and Singapore. The language is also spoken in southern Thailand, Cocos Islands, Christmas Island, Sri Lanka. It is spoken natively by approximately 33 million people throughout the Malay Archipelago and is used as a second language by an estimated 220 million.

The oldest form of Malay is descended from the Proto-Malayo-Polynesian language spoken by the earliest Austronesian settlers in Southeast Asia. This form would later evolve into Old Malay when Indian cultures and religions began penetrating the region. Old Malay contained some terms last until today, but remained unintelligible to modern speakers, while the modern language is already largely recognisable in written Classical Malay, which the oldest form dating back to 1303 CE. Malay evolved into Classical Malay through the gradual influx of numerous Arabic and Persian vocabulary when Islam made its way to the region, changing significantly in the process. Initially, Classical Malay was a diverse group of dialects, reflecting the varied origins of the Malay kingdoms of Southeast Asia. One of these dialects, that was developed in the literary tradition of the Malacca Sultanate in the 15th century, eventually became predominant.

The Malaccan era was marked with the transformation of the Malay language into an Islamic language, in similar fashion to Arabic, Persian, Urdu and Swahili. An adapted Arabic script called Jawi was used replacing the Kawi script, Islamic religious and cultural terminologies were abundantly assimilated, discarding many Hindu-Buddhist words, and Malay became the language of Islamic medium of instruction and dissemination throughout Southeast Asian region. At the height of Malacca's power in the 15th century, the Classical Malay spread beyond the traditional Malay speaking world and resulted in a lingua franca that was called Bahasa Melayu pasar ("Bazaar Malay") or Bahasa Melayu rendah ("Low Malay") as opposed to the Bahasa Melayu tinggi ("High Malay") of Malacca. It is generally believed that Bazaar Malay was a pidgin and the most important development, however, has been that pidgin creolised, creating several new languages such as the Ambonese Malay, Manado Malay and Betawi language.

European writers of the 17th and 18th centuries, such as Tavernier, Thomassin and Werndly describe Malay as "language of the learned in all the Indies, like Latin in Europe". It is also the most widely used during British and Dutch colonial era in the Malay Archipelago. The reversed was seen in the Spanish East Indies, where mass latinisation of the archipelago during the colonial years resulted the historical coup de grâce of the Malay language in the Philippines.

The dialect of Johor Sultanate, the direct successor of Malacca, became the standard speech among Malays in Singapore and Malaysia, and it formed the original basis for the standardised Indonesian language.

Apart from the standard Malay, developed within the Malacca-Johor sphere, various local Malay dialects exist. For example, the Bangkanese, the Bruneian, the Jambian, the Kelantanese, the Kedahan, the Negeri Sembilanese, the Palembangnese, the Pattanese, the Sarawakian, the Terengganuan, and many others.

The Malay language was historically written in Pallawa, Kawi and Rencong. After the arrival of Islam, Arabic-based Jawi script was adopted and is still in use today as one of the two official scripts in Brunei and as an alternative script in Malaysia. Beginning from the 17th century, as a result of British and Dutch colonisation, Jawi was gradually replaced by the Latin-based Rumi script which eventually became the official modern script for Malay language in Malaysia, Singapore, and Indonesia, and co-official script in Brunei.

=== Literature ===
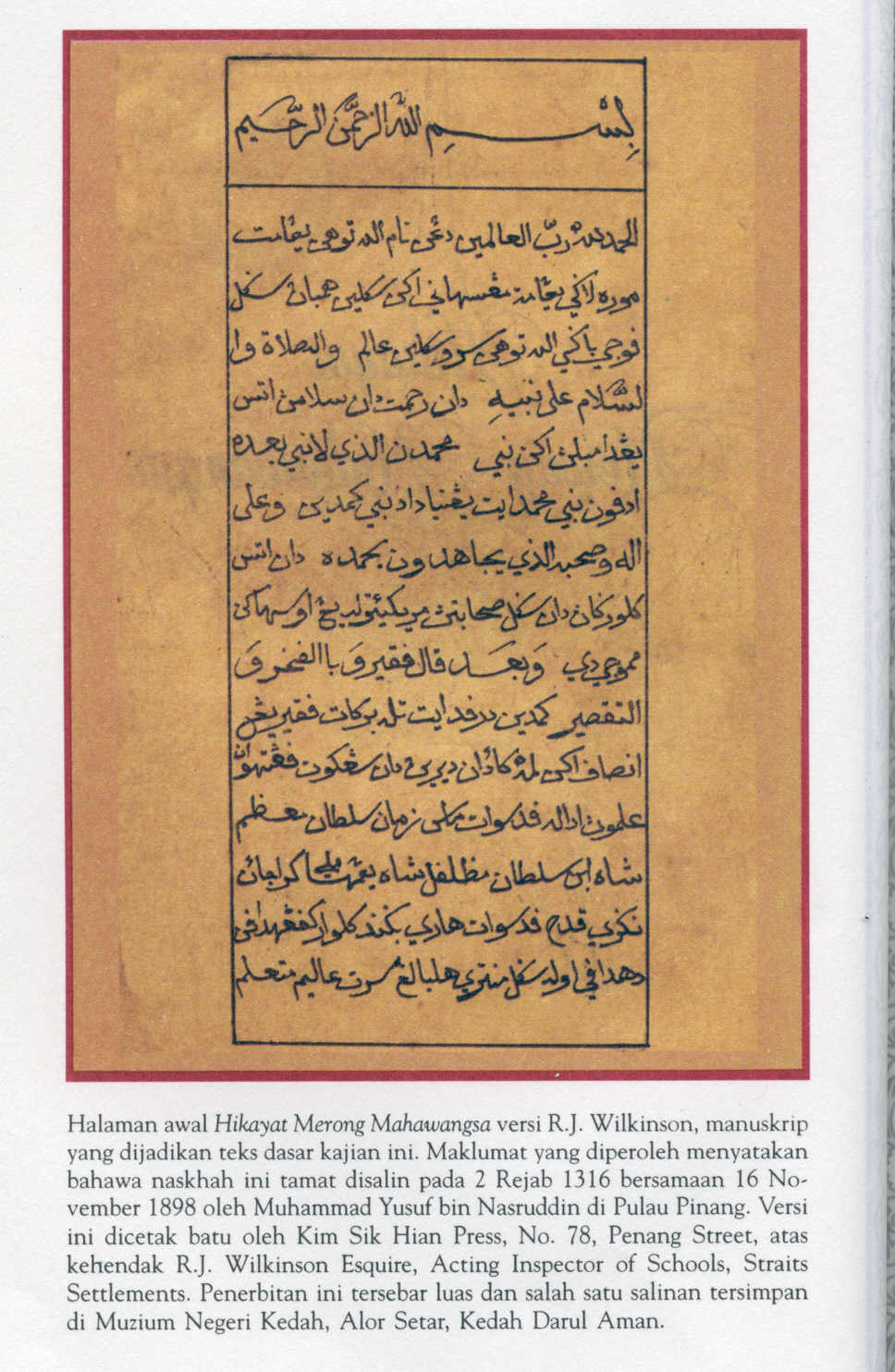
Hikayat Merong Mahawangsa in Jawi text. Also known as the Kedah Annals, it is an ancient Malay literature that chronicles the bloodline of Merong Mahawangsa and the foundation of Kedah.

The oral literature and classical literature of the Malays contain many portraits of the people, from ancient to contemporary periods.

Among the forms of poetry in Malay literature are – the Pantun, Syair and Gurindam.

The earliest form of Malay literature was the oral literature and its central subjects are traditional folklore relating to nature, animals and people. The classical Malay folklore is composed of traditional songs and music, heroic poems, animal fables, ghost stories, past events, fairy tales, symbolic lore, myths and bardic tales. Each of the stories possessed its own energy in terms of character, spirit, backdrop and storytelling and was largely crafted with the intend of happiness, guidance, educating, reminiscing, explaining, among few. The folklore were memorised and passed from one generation of storytellers to the next. Many of these tales were also written down by penglipur lara (storytellers) for example: Hikayat Malim Dewa, Hikayat Malim Deman, Hikayat Raja Donan, Hikayat Anggun Cik Tunggal, and Hikayat Awang Sulung Merah Muda.

When Indian influences made their way to the Malay Archipelago around 2000 years ago, Malay literature began incorporating Indian elements. Literature of this time is mostly translations of Sanskrit literature and romances, or at least some productions inspired by such, and is full of allusions to Hindu mythology. Probably to this early time may be traced such works as Hikayat Seri Rama (a free translation of the Ramayana), Hikayat Bayan Budiman (an adaptation of Śukasaptati) and Hikayat Panca Tanderan (an adaptation of Hitopadesha).

The era of classical Malay literature started after the arrival of Islam and the invention of Jawi script (Arabic based Malay script). Since then, Islamic beliefs and concepts began to make its mark on Malay literature. The Terengganu Inscription Stone, which is dated to 1303, is the earliest known narrative Malay writing. The stone is inscribed with an account of history, law, and romance in Jawi script. At its height, the Malacca Sultanate was not only the center of Islamisation, but also the center of Malay cultural expressions including literature. During this era, notable Middle Eastern literary works were translated and religious books were written in Malay language. Among famous translated works are Hikayat Muhammad Hanafiah and Hikayat Amir Hamzah.

The rise of Malay literature during the period was also penned by other homegrown literary composition coloured by mystical Sufism of the middle-east, the notable works of Hamzah Fansuri such as Asrar al-Arifin (Rahsia Orang yang Bijaksana; The Secret of the Wise), Sharab al-Asyikin (Minuman Segala Orang yang Berahi; The Drink of All the Passionate) and Zinat al-Muwahidin (Perhiasan Sekalian Orang yang Mengesakan; The Ornament of All the Devoted) can be seen as the magna opera of the era.

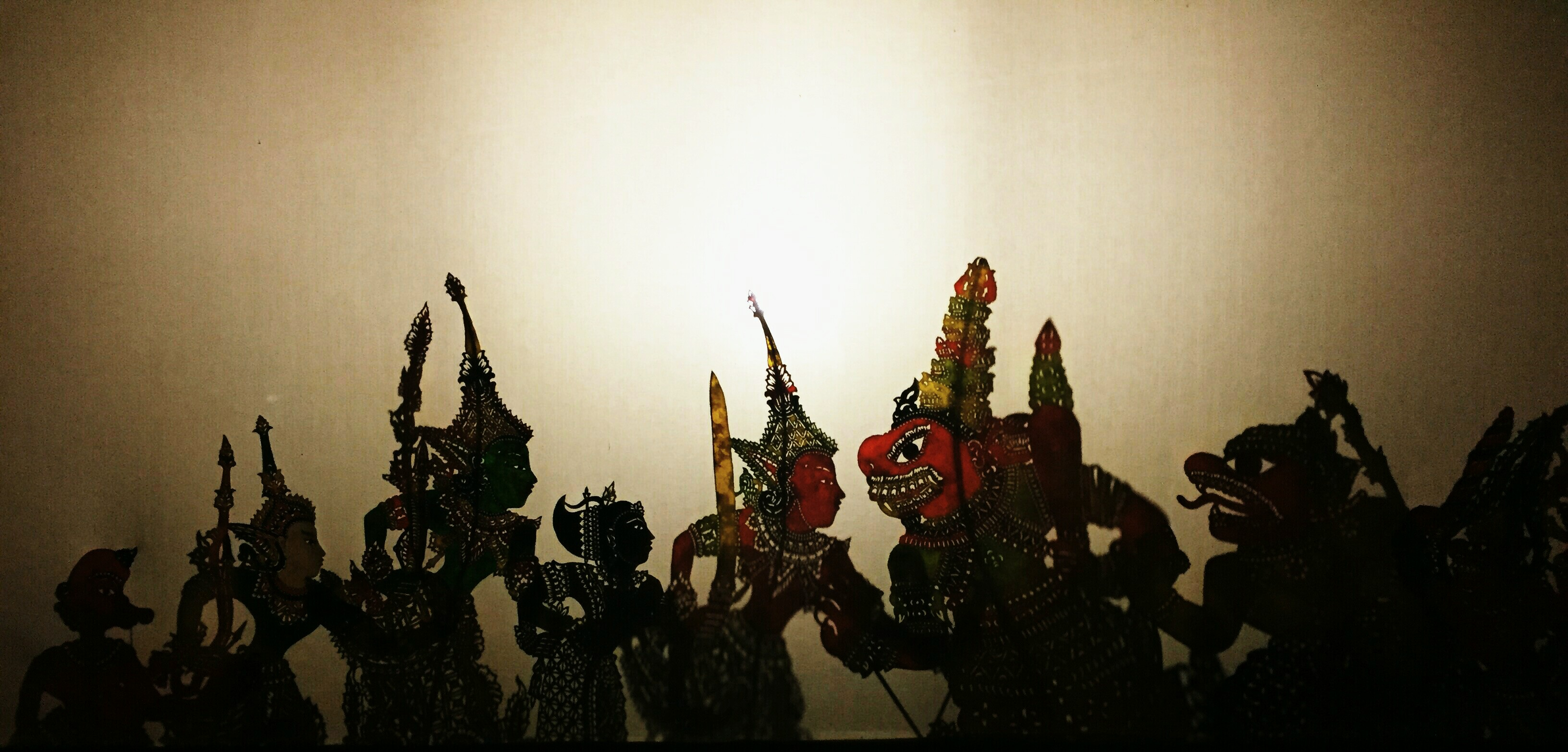
A Kelantan-Patani styled Wayang Kulit (Shadow play) that narrated the heroic tale of Hikayat Seri Rama

The most important piece of Malay literary works is perhaps the famed Malay Annals or Sulalatus Salatin. It was called "the most famous, distinctive and best of all Malay literary works" by one of the most prominent scholars in Malay studies, Sir Richard O. Winstedt. The exact date of its composition and the identity of its original author are uncertain, but under the order of Sultan Alauddin Riaayat Shah III of Johor in 1612, Tun Sri Lanang oversaw the editorial and compilation process of the Malay Annals.

In the 19th century, the Malay literature received some notable additions, including Kitab Ilmu Bedil (Book of Traditional Weaponry) that provides valuable details of traditional Malay ammunition and weaponry. The era also witnessed the wider usage of Malay medical journals, known as Kitab Tib. These works are indeed important as it serve as references to the Malay knowledge and technology during the classical era. Other 19th century Malay texts were written in Sumatra, these include the Kitab Pengetahuan Bahasa (Book of Linguistic Knowledge) by Raja Ali Haji and Perhimpunan Gunawan bagi Laki-Laki dan Perempuan (A Compendium of Charms for Men and Women) by Khatijah Terung, a wife of Raja Haji Abdullah bin Raja Hassan.

The same century also witnessed a monumental shift in the Malay literature through writings of Abdullah bin Abdul Kadir, a famous Malacca-born munshi of Singapore. Abdullah is regarded as the most cultured Malay who ever wrote, one of the greatest innovators in Malay letters and the father of modern Malay literature. His most important works are the Hikayat Abdullah (an autobiography), Kisah Pelayaran Abdullah ke Kelantan (an account of his trip for the government to Kelantan), and Kisah Pelayaran Abdullah ke Mekah (a narrative of his pilgrimage to Mecca 1854). His work was an inspiration to future generations of writers and marks an early stage in the transition from classical Malay literature to modern Malay literature.

=== Religion ===
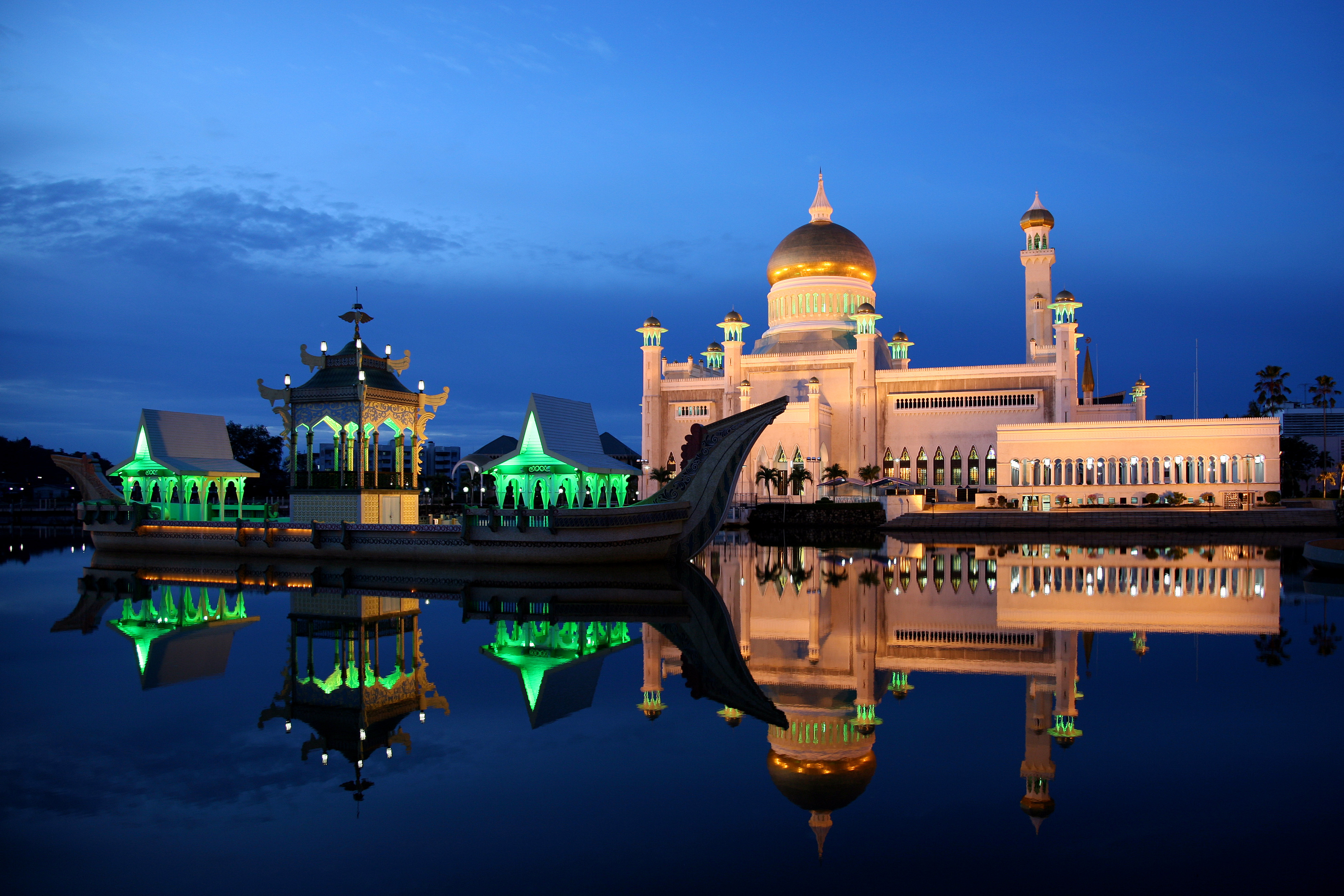
Sultan Omar Ali Saifuddin Mosque in Brunei on the eve of Ramadhan. The wealthy kingdom adopted Melayu Islam Beraja (Malay Islamic Monarchy) as the national philosophy since its independence in 1984.

The early Malay communities were largely animists, believing in the existence of semangat (spirits) in everything. Around the opening of the common era, Hinduism and Buddhism were introduced by South Asian traders to the Malay Archipelago, where they flourished until the 13th century, just before the arrival of Islam brought by Arab, South Asian and Chinese Muslim traders.

In the 15th century, Islam of the orthodox Sunni sect flourished in the Malay world under the Malacca Sultanate. In contrast with Hinduism, which superficially transformed early Malay society, Islam can be said to have been fully integrated into the daily life of the population. Since this era, the Malays are considered as ethnoreligious group and traditionally had a close identification with Islam and they have not changed their religion since. This identity is so strong that it is said to become Muslim was to masuk Melayu (to enter Malayness).

Nevertheless, the earlier beliefs having deeper roots, they have maintained themselves against the anathemas of Islam – and indeed Sufism mysticism have become intertwined among the Malays, with the spirits of the earlier animistic world and some elements of Hinduism. Following the 1970s, Islamic revival (also referred as re-Islamisation) throughout the Muslim world, many traditions that are regarded as contravene the teachings of Islam and contain elements of shirk were abandoned by the Malays in Malaysia, whereas in among Malays in Indonesia, these traditions are not considered as superstitious and containing elements of shirk. Among these traditions was the mandi safar festival (Safar bath), a bathing festival to achieve spiritual purity, which can be discerned features similar to some of those of the Durga Puja of India.

A vast majority of modern ethnic Malays are the adherents of Sunni Islam and the most important Malay festivals are those of Islamic origin — Hari Raya Aidilfitri, Hari Raya Aidiladha, Awal Muharram, and Maulidur Rasul. It is considered apostasy for Malays to convert out of Islam in Malaysia and Brunei. However, there are a number of ethnic Malays living outside of these countries have also embraced other religions legally under the law.

=== Architecture ===
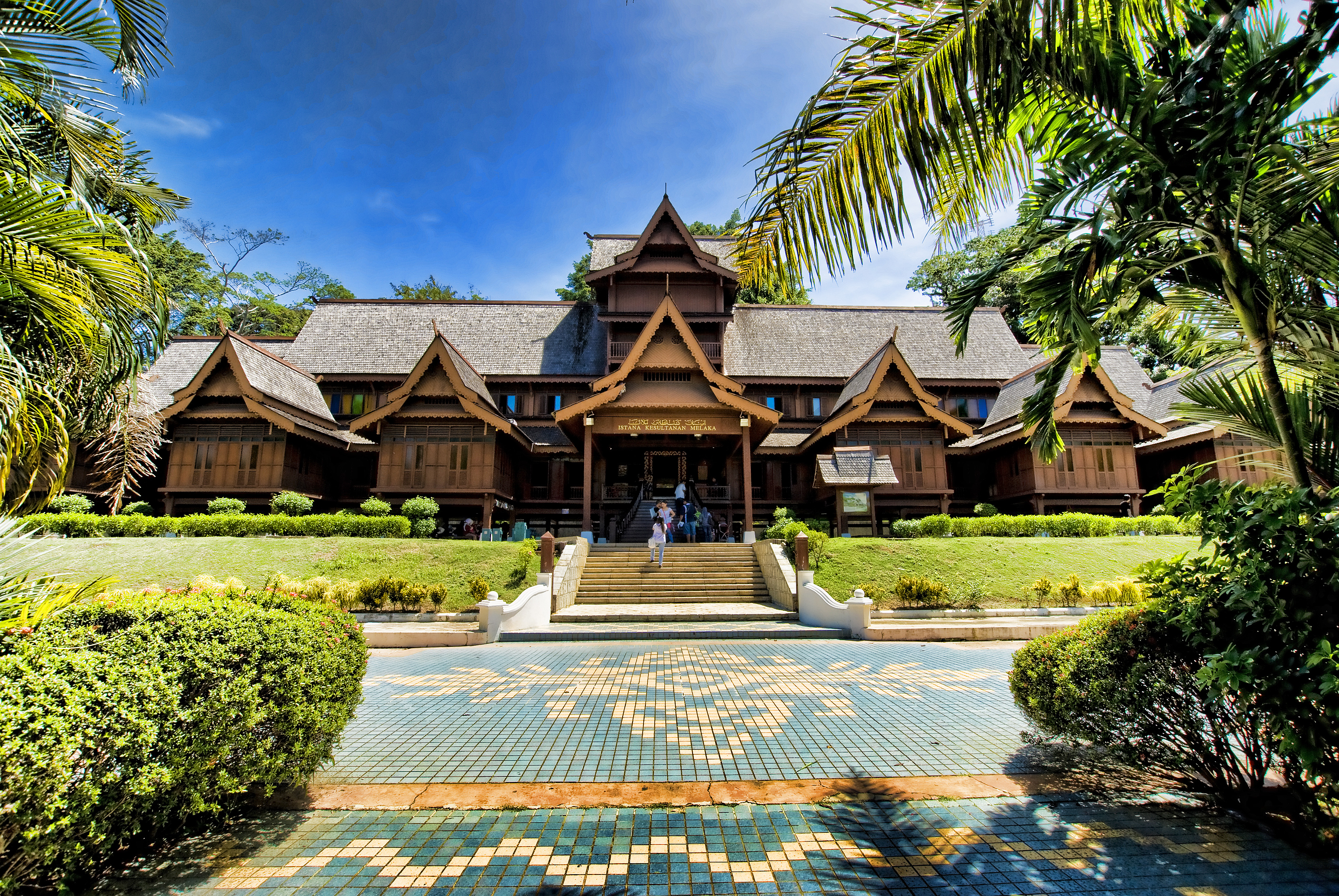
Replica of the Malacca Sultanate's Palace, which was built from information and data obtained from the Malay Annals. This historical document had references to the construction and the architecture of palaces during the era of Sultan Mansur Shah, who ruled from 1458 to 1477.

Various cultural influences, notably Chinese, Indian and Europeans, played a major role in forming Malay architecture. Until recent time, wood was the principal material used for all Malay traditional buildings. However, numerous stone structures were also discovered particularly the religious complexes from the time of Srivijaya and ancient isthmian Malay kingdoms.

Candi Muara Takus and Candi Muaro Jambi in Sumatra are among the examples that associated with the architectural elements of Srivijaya Empire. However, Srivijayan architecture was mostly represented at Chaiya (now a province in Thailand) in the Malay Peninsula, which was an important centre during the Srivijaya period. The type of structure consists of a cell-chamber to house the Buddha image and the summit of structure was erected in the form of stupa with successive, superimposed terraces which is the best example at Wat Pra Borom That of Chaiya.

There is also evidence of Hindu shrines or Candi around south Kedah between the mount Jerai and the Muda River valley, an area known as Bujang Valley. Within an area of about 350 square kilometres, 87 early historic religious sites have been reported and there are 12 candis located on mountain tops, a feature which suggests may derive from pre-historic Malay beliefs regarding sanctity of high places.

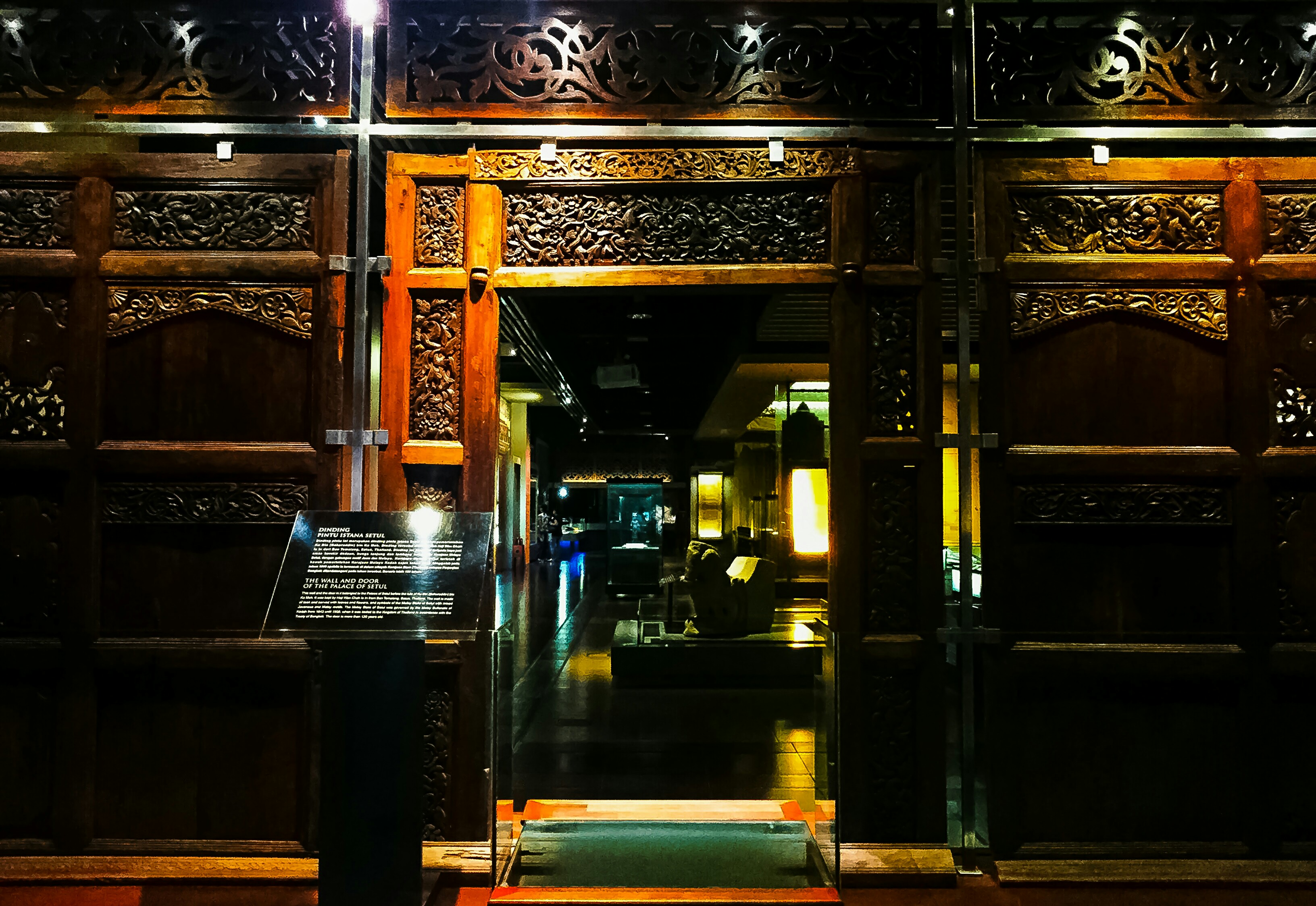
A wall panel adorned with various floral motives from the Setul Mambang Segara palatial residence as seen in the Muzium Negara. Setul was a historical Malay kingdom that existed between 1808 and 1915 in the northern Malay Peninsula.

Early reference on Malay architecture in the Malay Peninsula can be found in several Chinese records. A 7th-century Chinese account tells of Buddhist pilgrims calling at Langkasuka and mentioned the city as being surrounded by a wall on which towers had been built and was approached through double gates. Another 7th-century account of a special Chinese envoy to Red Earth Kingdom in the Malay Peninsula, recorded that the capital city had three gates more than a hundred paces apart, which were decorated with paintings of Buddhist themes and female spirits.

The first detailed description of Malay architecture was on the great wooden Istana of Mansur Shah of Malacca (reigned 1458–1477). According to Sejarah Melayu, the building had a raised seven bay structures on wooden pillars with a seven tiered roof in cooper shingles and decorated with gilded spires and Chinese glass mirrors.

The traditional Malay houses are built using simple timber-frame structure. They have pitched roofs, porches in the front, high ceilings, many openings on the walls for ventilation, and are often embellished with elaborate wood carvings. The beauty and quality of Malay wood carvings were meant to serve as visual indicators of the social rank and status of the owners themselves. The Salinger House, which won the 1998 Aga Khan Architectural Award, is a modern example of this traditional design.

Throughout many decades, the traditional Malay architecture has been influenced by Bugis and Java from the south, Siamese, British, Arab and Indian from the north, Portuguese, Dutch, Aceh and Minangkabau from the west and Southern Chinese from the east.

=== Visual art ===
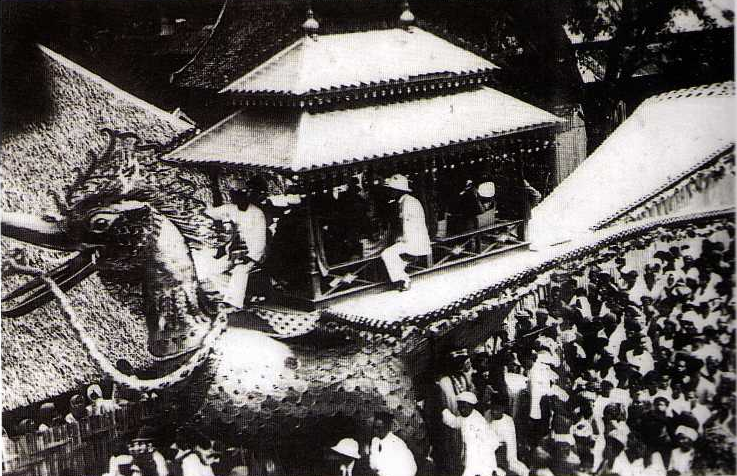
Burung Petala Indra, a giant mythical bird constructed for the grand circumcision parade of the Kelantanese prince

Wood carving is a part of classical Malay visual arts. The Malays had traditionally adorned their monuments, boats, weapons, tombs, musical instrument, and utensils by motives of flora, calligraphy, geometry and cosmic features. The art is done by partially removing the wood using sharp tools and following specific patterns, composition and orders. The art form, known as ukir, is hailed as an act of devotion of the craftsmen to the creator and a gift to his fellowmen.

The art form is mainly attributed to the abundance of timber on the Malay Archipelago and also by the skilfulness of the woodcarvers that have allowed the Malays to practice woodcarving as a craft. The natural tropical settings where flora and fauna are abundant has inspired the motives to be depicted in abstract or stylised form into the timber board. With the coming of Islam, geometric and Islamic calligraphy form were introduced in the wood carving. The woods used are typically from tropical hardwood species which is known to be durable and can resist the attacks of fungi, power-boots beetles and termites.

A typical Malay traditional houses or mosque would have been adorned with more than 20 carved components. The carving on the walls and the panels allow the air breeze to circulate effectively in and out of the building and can let the sunlight illuminate the interior of the structure. At the same time, the shadow cast by the panels would also create a shadow based on the motives adding the beauty on the floor. Thus, the carved components perform both functional and aesthetic purposes.

=== Pottery ===
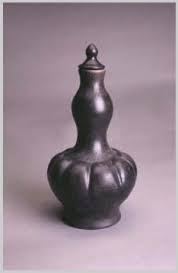
An ebony-coloured Labu Sayong, a classic Malay jar from Kuala Kangsar, Perak, Malaysia

Under the Malay culture, pottery is not solely witnessed as a mere household utensil. It is perceived as a work of art, a paradigm of talent, embroidered with aesthetic, legacy, perseverance and religious devotion. The Malay earthen is usually unglazed, with the ornamental designs were carved when the pottery is semi-dried during its construction process.

According to several studies, the native Malay pottery industry has developed indigenously from the period of great antiquity and has since encapsulates a high-level of culture sophistication. It also has been noted that the design features of the Malay pottery suggested the absence of the foreign influence prior to the 19th century, a paradox considering the vast cultural contact between the Malays and the outside world.

Among the renowned traditional Malay pottery includes Mambong of Kelantan, moulded from clay and identified with the colour of terracotta. It is usually assumed the form as cooking utensils. In the west coast, the raven-coloured Labu Sayong of Kuala Kangsar is honoured for gourd-formed jars. There are also several variants of Labu, including Labu Tela, Labu Kepala, Labu Gelugor Tela and Labu Gelugor Kepala.

Other forms of Malay traditional pottery are: The Belanga, commonly in a wide rim and a round base, the pot usually mobilised to cook curries. It is held that the structure of the earthen would aid the heat to be evenly distributed, correlating to its round base. A smaller version of the Belanga is called periok, used for rice-preparation; The Buyong, commonly defined by a straight collar and a spherical body, oftentime used as a water jar; The Terenang, the angular Terenang is used as a canister, especially in the coastal Malay regions of Kelantan, Patani and Terengganu; The Bekas Bara, a small container, usually crafted for the use of incense; The Jambangan, a traditional Malay vase, usually for aesthetic purposes and Geluk, a small water storage.

=== Cuisine ===
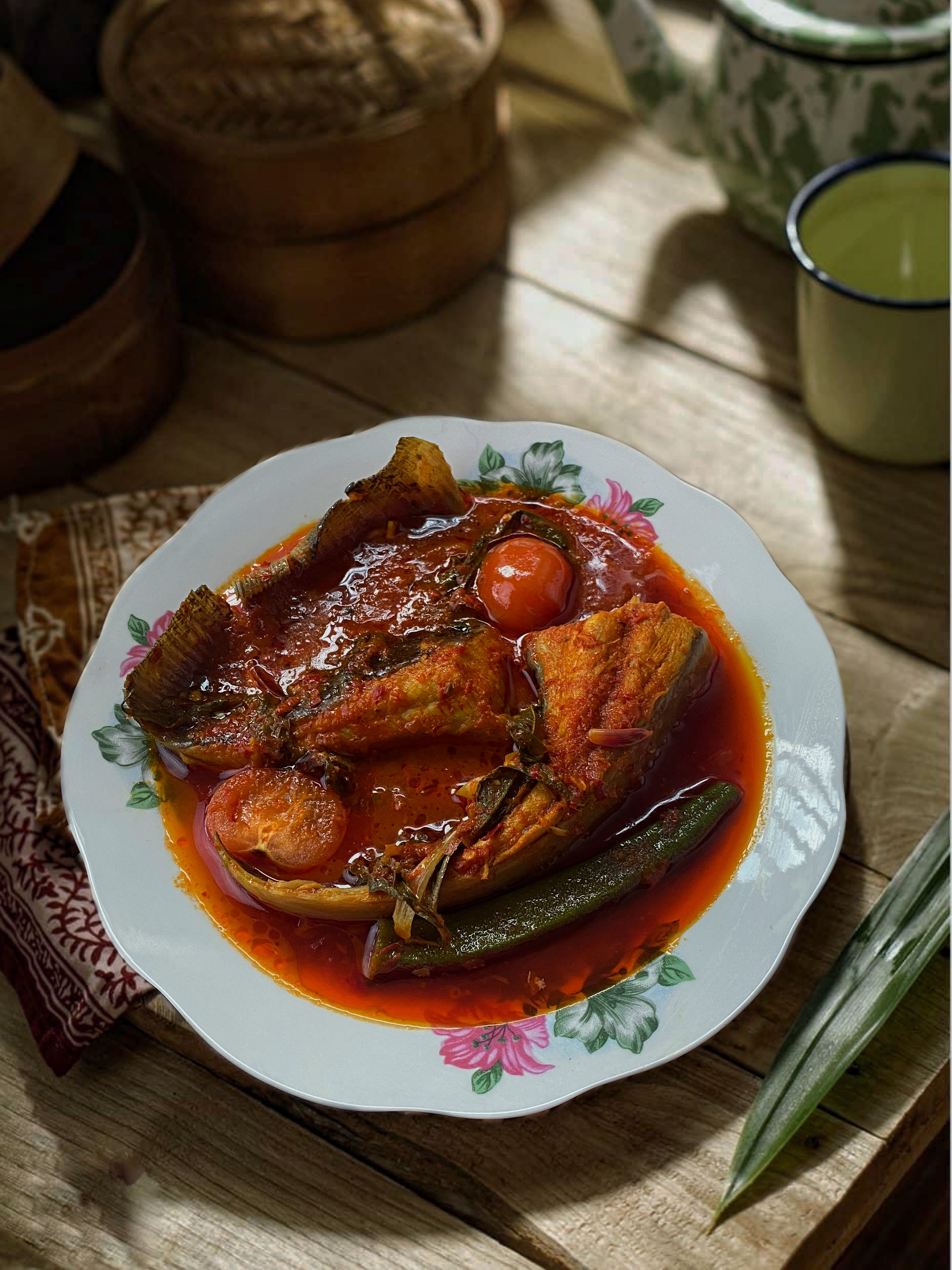
Asam pedas, a sour and spicy gulai

Malay cuisine is characterised by the extensive use of aromatic spices, coconut milk, fermented ingredients and fresh herbs, resulting in dishes with complex and robust flavour profiles. Representative components of the cuisine include gulai (spiced coconut-based stews), asam pedas (sour and spicy stews), ketupat (compressed rice cakes commonly associated with festive consumption), nasi minyak (spiced rice dish prepared with ghee), rendang (slow-cooked spiced meat), sambal (chilli-based condiments), keropok (fish or shrimp crackers), traditional kuih (bite-sized cakes and sweets), dodol (sweet coconut-based confections) and fermented preparations such as perkasam.

While sharing a common culinary foundation, regional Malay cuisines exhibit considerable variation shaped by geography, local agricultural resources, trade networks and historical interactions. Distinct regional specialities include nasi dagang, nasi kerabu and keropok lekor in Pattani, Terengganu and Kelantan; Pahang and Perak for its durian-based cuisine, gulai tempoyak; Kedah and Penang for their northern-style asam laksa and rojak; Satun and Perlis for its bunga kuda dessert; Negeri Sembilan for its lemak-based dishes; Malacca for their spicy cincalok; Singapore for their rojak bandung and roti prata; Riau for its ikan patin (Pangasius fish) dishes, gulai ikan patin and asam pedas ikan patin; Riau Islands for their sup ikan; Deli Malays of North Sumatra for their nasi goreng teri medan and gulai ketam; Jambi for its ikan mas panggang and tempoyak; Palembangese Malays of South Sumatra for their pempek, mi celor and nasi minyak; Bangka Belitung for its siput gonggong and terang bulan; West Kalimantan and Sarawak for its bubur pedas and ayam pansuh; and Brunei for their Nasi katok and unique ambuyat dish.

The main characteristic in traditional Malay cuisine is undoubtedly the generous use of spices. Coconut milk is also important in giving the Malay dishes their rich, creamy character. The other foundation is belacan (shrimp paste), which is used as a base for sambal, a rich sauce or condiment made from belacan, chillies, onions and garlic. Malay cooking also makes plentiful use of lemongrass and galangal.

Nearly every Malay meal is served with rice, the staple food in many other East Asian cultures. Although there are various type of dishes in a Malay meal, all are served at once, not in courses. Food is eaten delicately with the fingers of right hand, never with the left which is used for personal ablutions, and Malays rarely use utensils. Because most of Malay people are Muslims, Malay cuisine follows Islamic halal dietary law rigorously. Protein intake are mostly taken from beef, water buffalo, goat, and lamb meat, and also includes poultry and fishes. Pork and any non-halal meats, also alcohol is prohibited and absent from Malay daily diet.

Nasi lemak, rice cooked in rich coconut milk probably is the most popular dish ubiquitous in Malay town and villages. Nasi lemak is considered as Malaysia's national dish. While Nasi Minyak and Nasi Hujan Panas, rice broiled with ghee and spices is hailed as a ceremonial dish for special occasions, especially during the traditional Malay weddings.

=== Performing arts ===
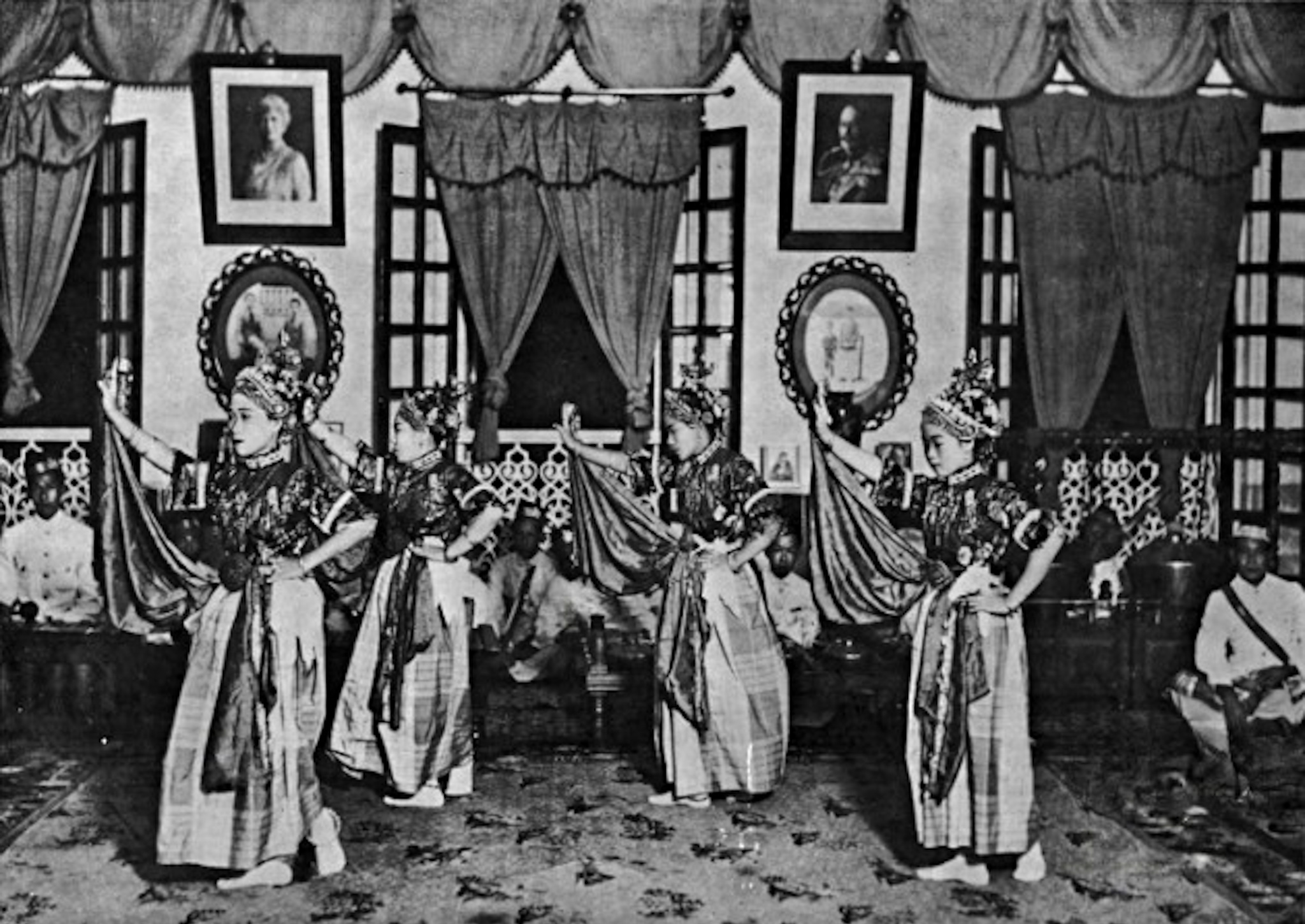
Joget Gamelan performance, 1937

The Malays have diverse kinds of music and dance which are fusions of different cultural influences. Typical genres range from traditional Malay folk dances dramas like Mak Yong to the Arab-influenced Zapin dances. Choreographed movements also vary from simple steps and tunes in Dikir barat to the complicated moves in Joget Gamelan.

Traditional Malay music is basically percussive. Various kinds of gongs provide the beat for many dances. There are also drums of various sizes, ranging from the large rebana ubi used to punctuate important events to the small jingled-rebana (frame drum) used as an accompaniment to vocal recitations in religious ceremonies.

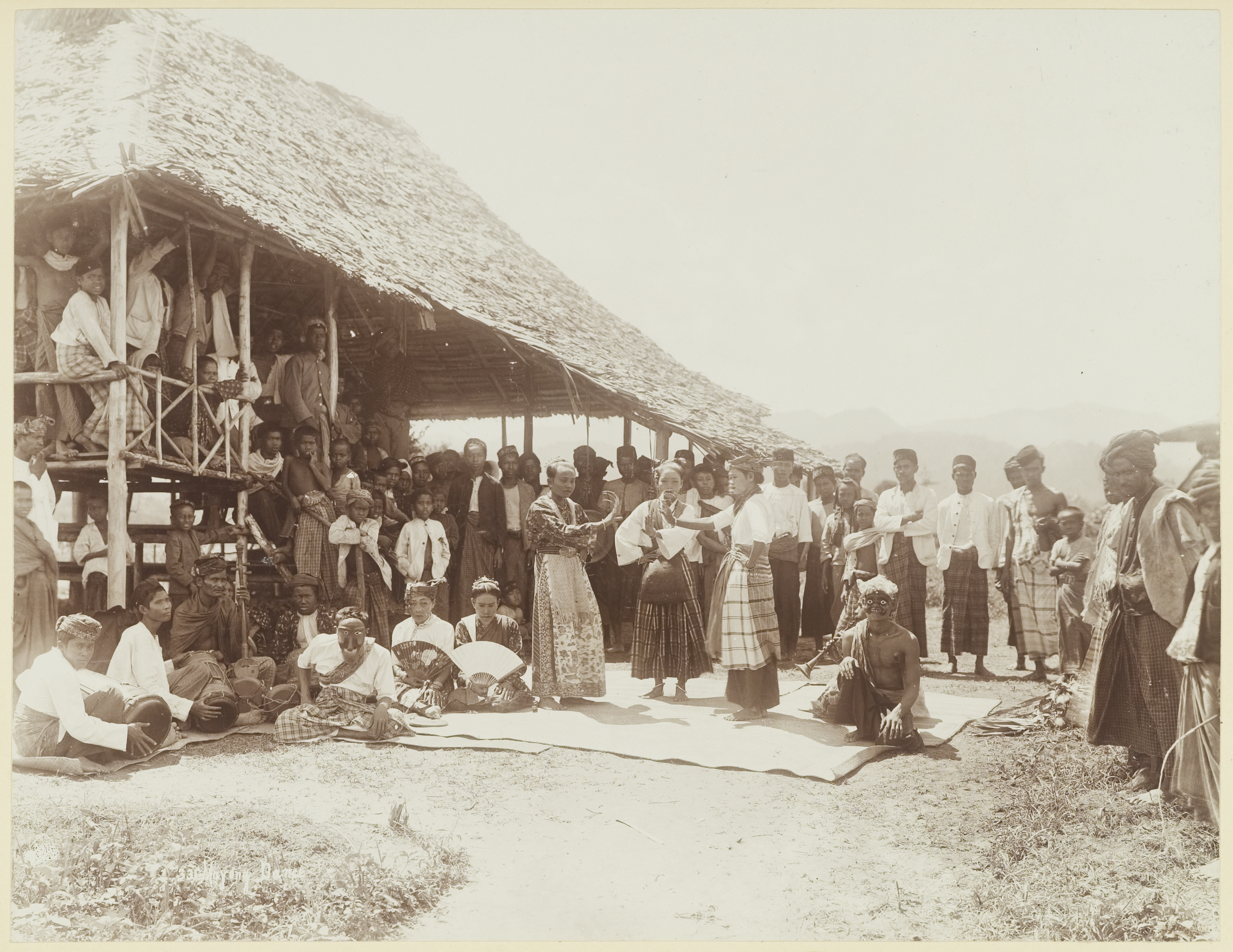
A troupe of Siamese Malay dancers performing the Mak Yong (c. 19th century). In 2005, it received recognition as being among the masterpieces of the oral and intangible heritage of humanity by UNESCO.

Nobat music became part of the Royal Regalia of Malay courts since the arrival of Islam in the 12th century and only performed in important court ceremonies. Its orchestra includes the sacred and highly revered instruments of nehara (kettledrums), gendang (double-headed drums), nafiri (trumpet), serunai (oboe), and sometimes a knobbed gong and a pair of cymbals.

Indian influences are strong in a traditional shadow play known as Wayang Kulit where stories from Hindu epics; Ramayana & Mahabharata form the main repertoire. There are four distinctive types of shadow puppet theatre that can be found in Malay Peninsula; Wayang Gedek, Wayang Purwa, Wayang Melayu and Wayang Siam. Nonetheless, the art and the storytelling of Wayang Purwa and Wayang Siam denote a regional influence in fused with the Javanese and Siamese respectively, while Wayang Melayu and Wayang Gedek narrated a more autochthonously Malay form and fashion.

Other well-known Malay performing arts are; Bangsawan theatre, Dondang Sayang love ballad and Mak Inang dance from Malacca Sultanate, Jikey and Mek Mulung theatre from Kedah, Asyik dance and Menora dance drama from Patani and Kelantan, Ulek mayang and Rodat dance from Terengganu, Boria theatre from Penang, Canggung dance from Perlis, Mukun narrative songs from Brunei and Sarawak, Gending Sriwijaya from Palembang, Serampang Dua Belas dance from Serdang,Zapin Api firedance from Riau and Dikir barat Singapura from Singapore.

=== Traditional dress ===
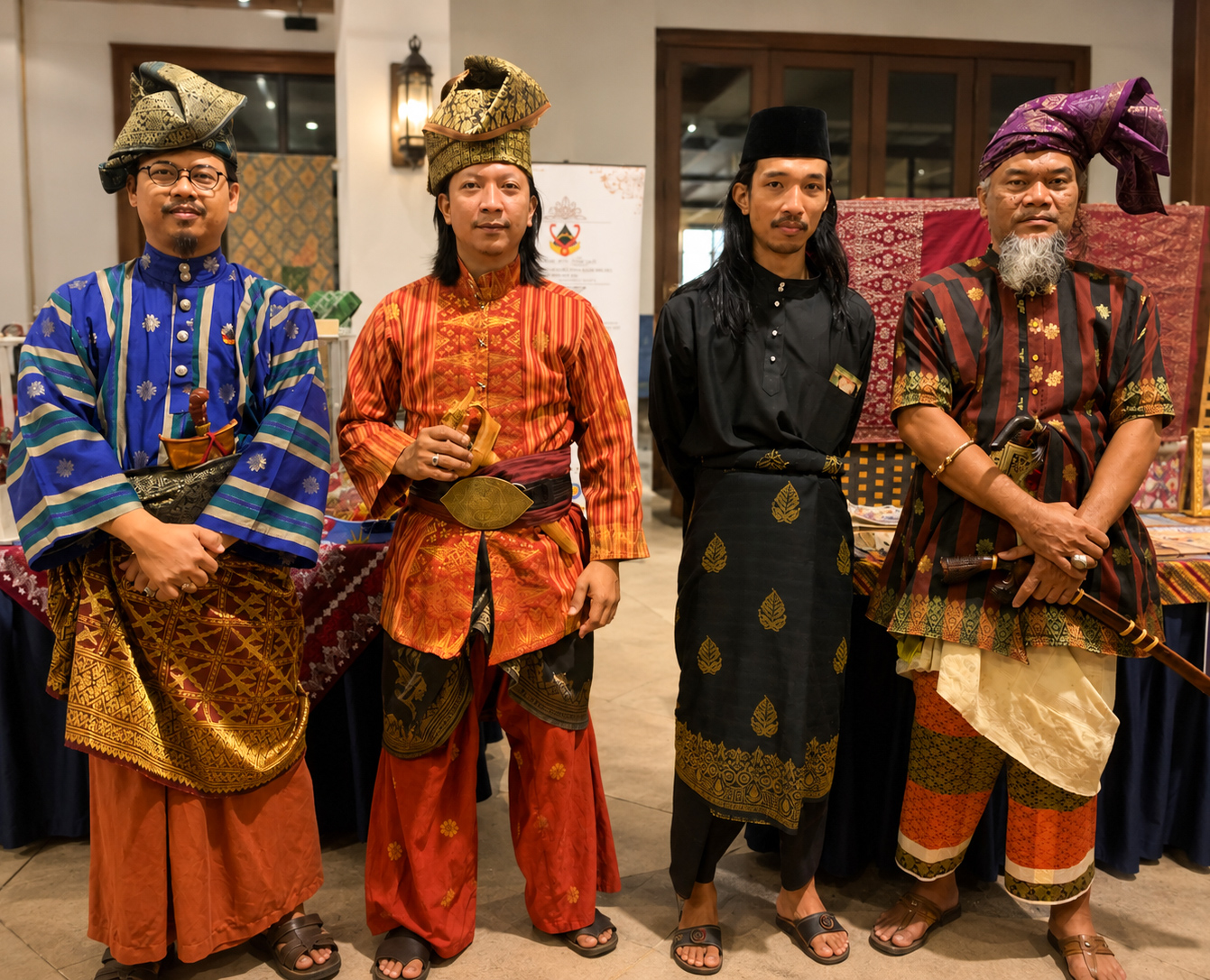
Malay men in busana Melayu, a traditional style of Malay attire

The traditional Malay apparel and textile has been continuously morphed since the time of antiquity. Historically, the ancient Malays were chronicled to incorporate various natural materials as a vital source for fabrics, clothing and attire. The common era however, witnessing the early arrivals the merchants from east and west to the harbours of Malay Archipelago, together they bought new luxurious items, including fine cotton and silks. The garments subsequently become a source of high Malay fashion and acquired a cultural role as the binding identity in the archipelago, especially in the peninsula, Sumatra and the coastal areas of Borneo.

In Malay culture, clothes and textiles are revered as symbols of beauty, power and status. Numerous accounts in Malay hikayats stressed the special place occupied by textiles. The Malay handloom industry can be traced its origin since the 13th century when the eastern trade route flourished under Song dynasty. Mentions of locally made textiles as well as the predominance of weaving in the Malay Peninsula were made in various Chinese and Arab accounts. Among well-known Malay textiles are Songket, Batik, Telepok, Limar, Tenun, Kelingkam, Cindai, Pelangi and Tekad.

Classical Malay dress varies between different regions, but the most profound traditional dress in modern-day are Baju Kurung (for women) and Baju Melayu (for men), which both recognised as the national dress for Malaysia and Brunei, and also worn by Malay communities in Indonesia, Singapore, Philippines, Myanmar and Thailand.

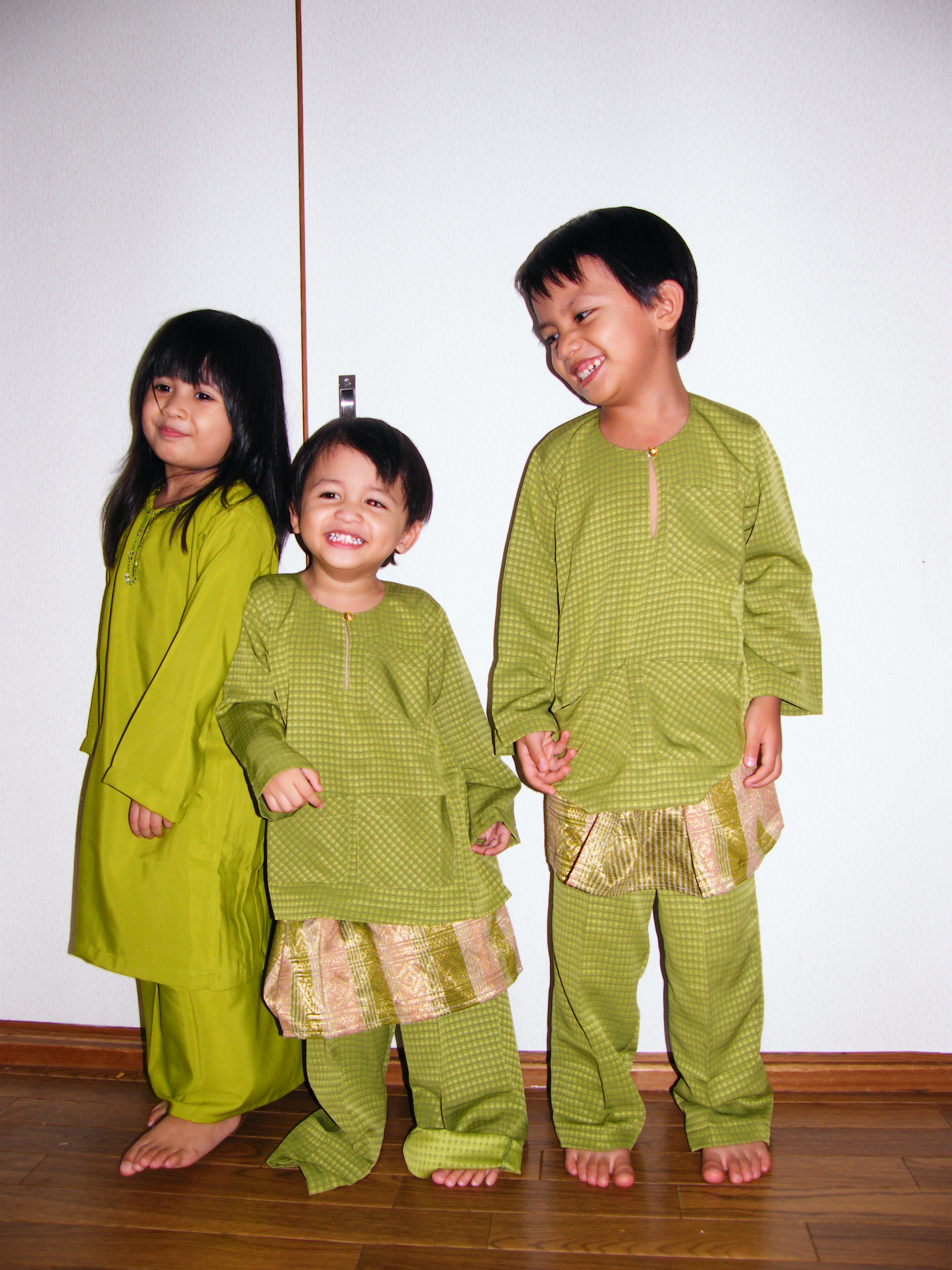
Malay children wearing traditional dress during Eid al-Fitr

The word Baju Kurung, literary defined as "encase the body" of the wearer is tailored based on the Islamic principles of modesty, decency and humility. The practice is parallel to the Judaeo-Christian religious doctrine, as flaunting the intimate body parts is considered as forbidden in Islam. The interpretation was then absorbed to the Malay way of dressing and cultural perspective, this can be strongly witnessed upon the rule of Mansur Shah of Malacca in the 15th century, the sultan prohibited his female Muslim subjects in the public from wearing only a sarong from the bust downwards. Throughout the ages, The Malay Baju Kurung went into several reincarnation before assuming its current form. Due to the vastness of various Malay kingdoms in the archipelago, local and distinct forms of the Baju Kurung design patterns can also be witnessed in the region, including Bengkulu, Kedah, Jambi, Johor-Riau, Pahang and Palembang.

The corresponding mode of Baju Kurung for men is known as "Baju Melayu". The upper part of the garment was made with a geometrical design almost the same as the Baju Kurung and commonly paired with woven cloth known as the sarong. The pattern of the sarong may include a symbol of the person's marital status or their rank in traditional Malay society.

Other common classical Malay attire for men consists of a baju (shirt) or tekua (a type of a long sleeve shirt), baju rompi (vest), kancing (button), a small leg celana (trousers), a sarong worn around the waist, capal (sandal), and a tanjak or tengkolok (headgear); for the aristocrats, the baju sikap or baju layang (a type of coat) and pending (ornamental belt buckle) are also synonymous to be worn as a formal attire. It was also common for a pendekar (Malay warrior) to have a Kris tucked into the front fold of sarong.

In contrast to Baju Melayu which continued to be worn as ceremonial dress only, Baju Kurung is worn daily throughout the year by a majority of Malay women. Sighting of female civil servants, professional workers and students wearing Baju Kurung is common in Malaysia and Brunei.

=== Festivals and celebrations ===
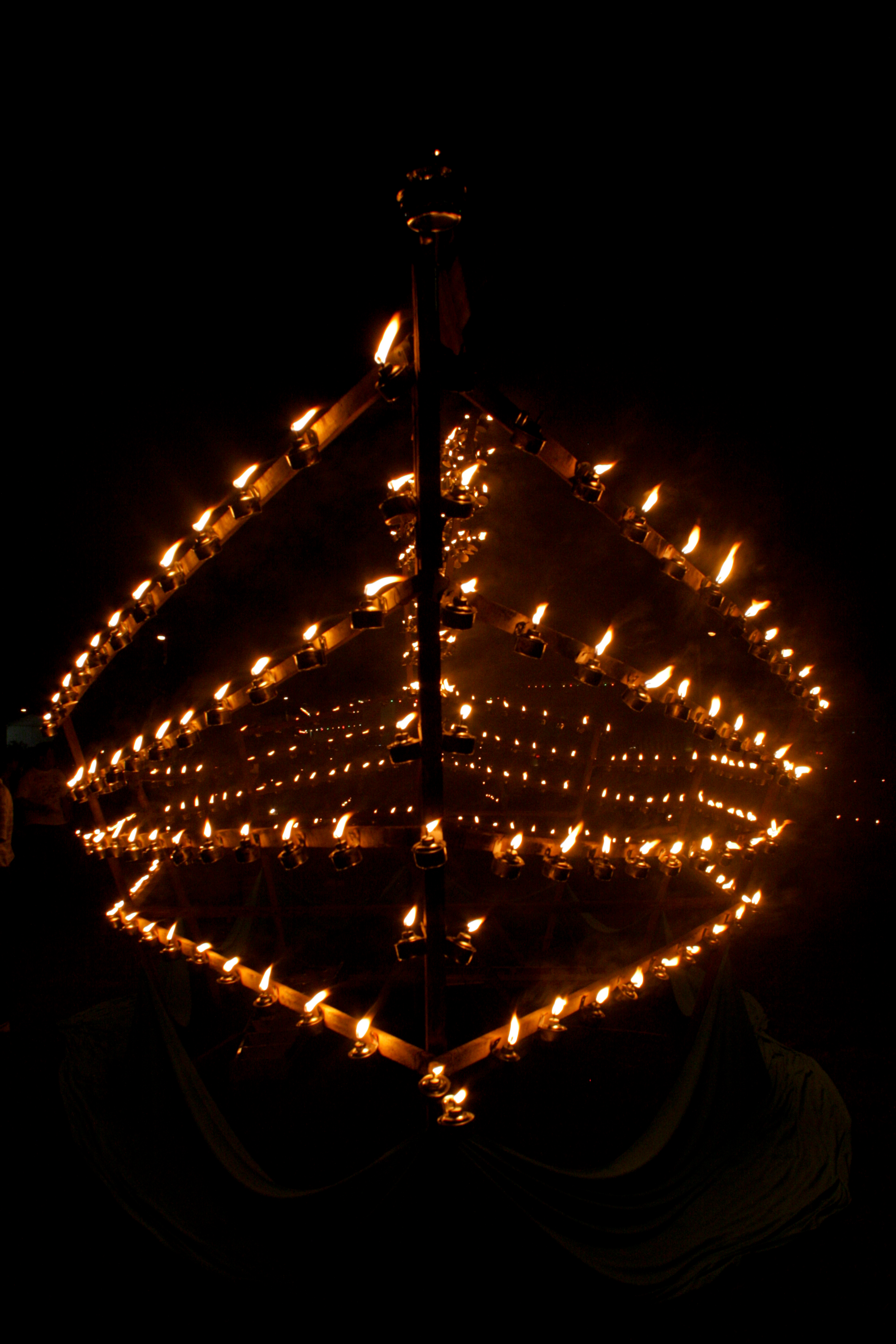
Rows of Pelita (oil lamps) lighted during Malam Tujuh Likur (the 27th night of Ramadhan), the oil lamps are traditionally used to illuminate homes and the streets during the Ramadhan. Seen here in Muar, Johor, Malaysia.

The rise of Islam managed to redefine the Malay identity by the 15th century. Thus, resulting most of the Malay festivals and celebrations to run parallel with the Islamic calendar, albeit deeply ingrained with a strong sense of Malay character. The biannual Hari Raya (lit "the Great Day") observance of Aidilfitri and Aidiladha are hailed as the grand celebrations universally across the Malay community. The two holidays are instrumental to commentate two major events and philosophy in the Islamic teaching and beliefs. The former signifies the triumph as a Muslim after a month of fasting and patience in Ramadan, while the latter is to observe the sacrifice made by Ibrahim (Abraham) under the name of Allah.

The Raya holidays usually commenced during the homecoming event known as Balik Kampung or Balik Raya which occurred a few days before the festival. During the Hari Raya, the Malays would celebrated by performing the Eid prayers, holding a grand feast and visiting friends, relatives and neighbours. A visit to the grave of the departed loved ones is also essential, as a sign of respect, love and honour.

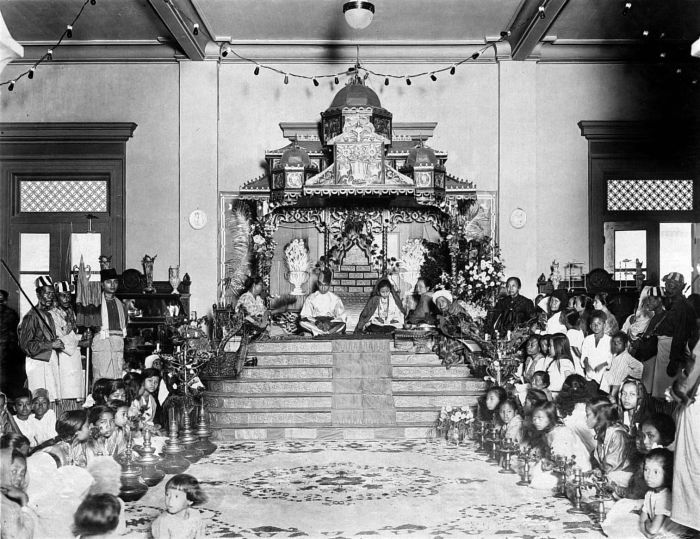
The coronation ceremony between Tengku Otteman, as the Tengku Mahkota (Crown Prince) of Deli Sultanate, Dutch East Indies; with his wife, Raja Amnah, a member of Perak Royalty as Tengku Puan Indera in 1925

Other major liturgical and religious ceremonies celebrated by the Malays include Ramadhan, a month-long holy month devoted by daytime fasting and various religious activities; Maulidur Rasul, a special grand procession to honour the birth of Muhammad; Ashura, remembrance of Muharram where the Malays would solemnly prepared a special dish, known as Bubur Ashura; Nisfu Syaaban, the Mid-Sha'ban observance, a special day of fasting for forgiveness; Nuzul Quran, the first revelation of the Quran; Israk dan Mikraj, the ascension of Muhammad to the heavens and Awal Muharram, the Islamic New Year; the latter three celebrations are usually observed by holding a special sunat prayers, religious lectures and Islamic discussions in the mosque.

There are also a plethora of domestic regional cultural festivals and social events within different the Malay spheres. The coastal areas were historically known to observed the Mandi Safar or Puja Pantai ceremony, a purifying bath during the Islamic month of Safar, originally emulated from the ancient pre-Islamic Malay holy cleansing rituals, akin to the Belimau tradition before Ramadan; and Pesta Menuai, a harvest festival celebrated by the inland and agrarian Malay communities by traditional games, theatre, Joget and other repertoire of dance-play. However, both of the practice is gradually extinct owing from various social and economic revolution engineered in the Malay community in the 20th century. Additionally, many Malays are also known to participate in the imperial celebrations to honour the royal courts of their respective kingdoms.

The Islamic features also strongly embroidered the Malay celebrations in the individual level, a juxtaposition bonded to the spiritual rite of passage as a Muslim. The Malays would usually organised kenduri, a religious ceremonial banquet to celebrate or to seek blessing for an event. There are several philosophical variations of kenduri, raging from Doa Selamat (asking for divine favour and protection), Kesyukuran (for thanksgiving and gratitude), Melenggang Perut (ceremonial massage for a mother who is pregnant with her first child), Aqiqah and Cukur Jambul (newborn ceremony, for celebrating a new life), Bertindik (the first piercing ceremony for a female child), Khatam (a graduation ceremony, after a child's first full-reading of the Quran), Khatan (circumcision), Kahwin (wedding), Arwah or Tahlil (prayers for a deceased person), among few. The event is usually organised by the family and was traditionally aided by the community in a social gathering known as Rewang or Gotong-royong. During this ceremony, the whole family would be assisted by their neighbours and relatives, delegating various tasks raging from food preparations, venue management, logistic assembly and other technical control. Nevertheless, following the rise of urbanism in the contemporary Malay community, the practice of Rewang/Gotong-Royong is gradually superseded by hired-caterer services by the family.

=== Martial arts ===
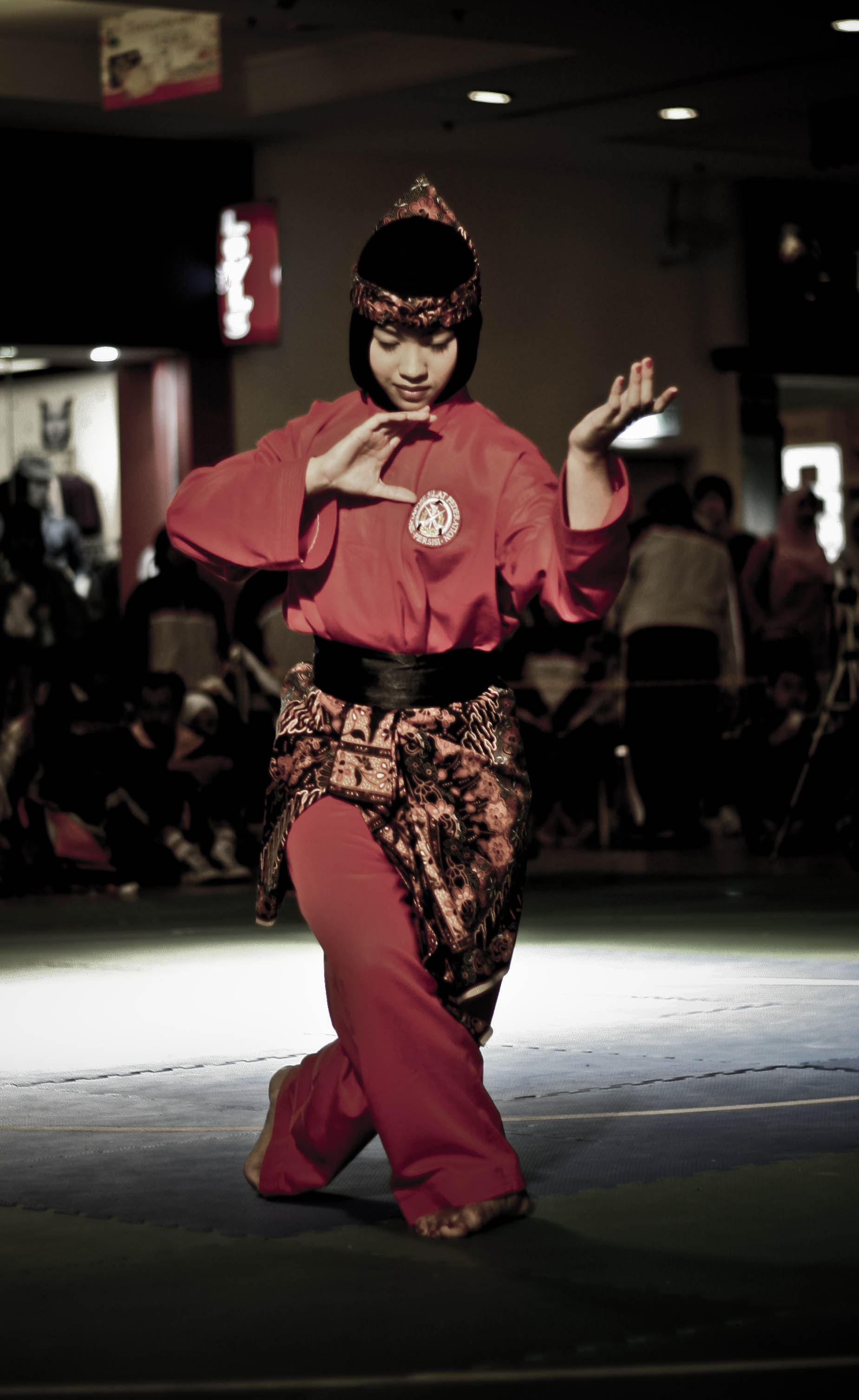
A female silat practitioner from Singapore

Silat and its variants can be found throughout the Malay world: the Malay Peninsula (including Singapore), the Riau Islands, Sumatra and coastal areas of Borneo. Archaeological evidence reveals that, by the 6th century, formalised combat arts were being practised in the Malay Peninsula and Sumatra. The earliest forms of Silat are believed to have been developed and used in the armed forces of the ancient Malay kingdoms of Langkasuka (2nd century) and Srivijaya (7th century).

The influence of the Malay sultanates of Malacca, Johor, Pattani and Brunei has contributed to the spread of this martial art in the Malay Archipelago. Through a complex maze of sea channels and river capillaries that facilitated exchange and trade throughout the region, Silat wound its way into the dense rainforest and up into the mountains. The legendary Laksamana Hang Tuah of Malacca is one of the most renowned pesilat (Silat practitioners) in history and even considered by some as the father of Malay silat. Since the classical era, Silat Melayu underwent great diversification and formed what is today traditionally recognised as the source of Indonesian Pencak Silat and other forms of Silat in Southeast Asia.

Apart from Silat, Tomoi is also practised by Malays, mainly in the northern region of the Malay Peninsula. It is a variant of Indo-Chinese forms of kickboxing which is believed to have been spread in the Southeast Asian mainland since the time of Funan Empire (68 CE).

=== Metal working ===
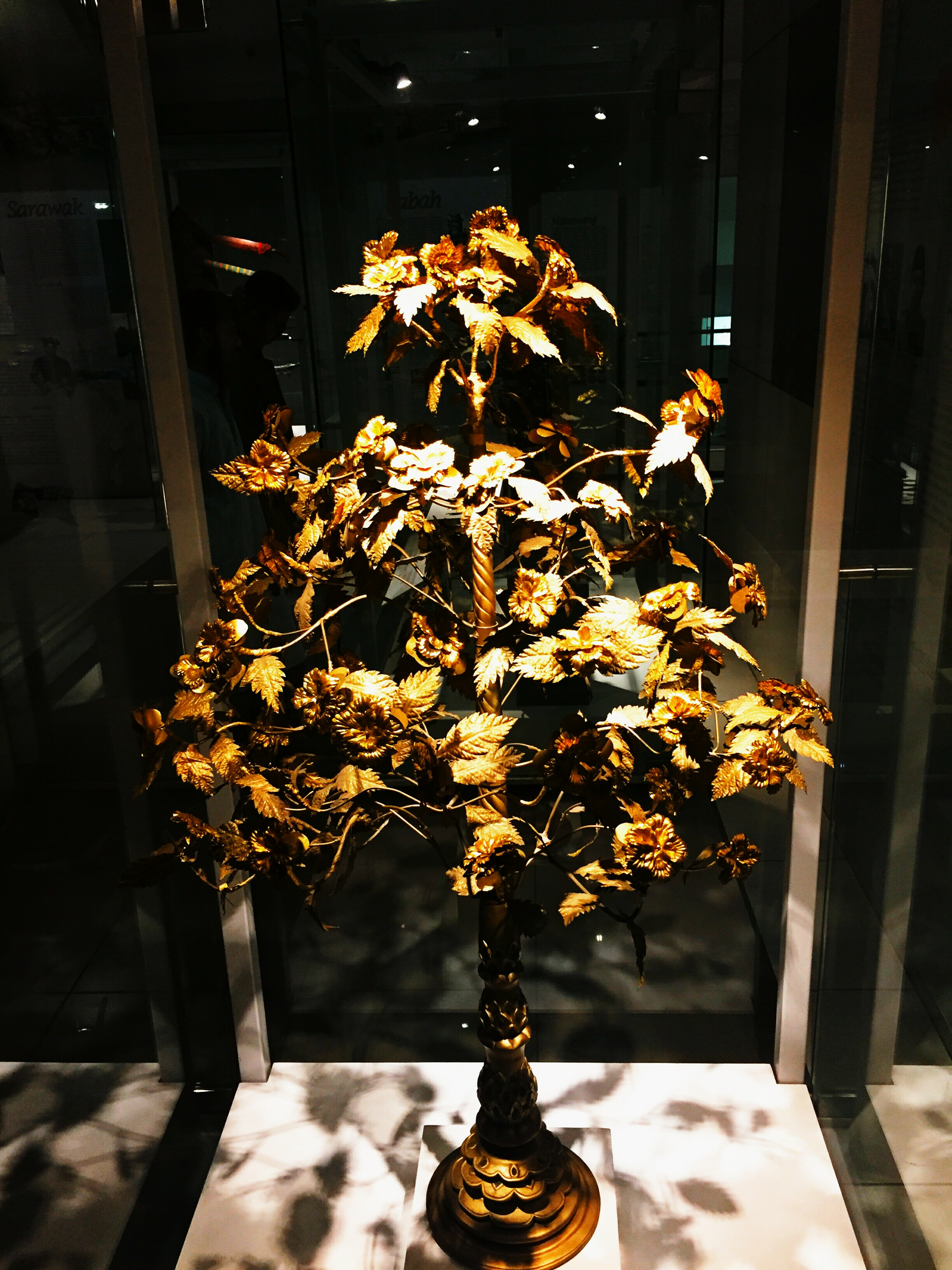
The Bunga Mas, National Museum of Malaysia. The Bunga Mas was offered by the northern Malay states of Terengganu, Kelantan, Kedah, Pattani, Nong Chik, Yala, Rangae, Kubang Pasu and Setul to the King of Ayutthaya (Siam) as a symbol of allegiance.

Upon the turn of the 17th century, gold, silver, iron and brass have all been perfectly moulded to become part and parcel to the Malay society. The era witnessed the works of metal received a critical royal patronage. A multitude of Malay metalworks manifested as evidence of this era, raging from a peculiar Malay dagger known as Keris made of iron, down to the elaborate fine jewellery made from gold and silver. For the Malay nobles during this period, the works of pending (ornamental Belt buckle embellished with precious stones), keronsang (brooch) and cucuk sanggul (hairpins) were staged to become among the most sought item of fashion. The era also hosted a number of other prominent items in the Malay regalia cast in gold, including ceremonial box, Tepak sirih (Betel container) and parts of Keris. The art of working gold was predominantly done by repoussé and granulation techniques, in which the traditional methods can still be witnessed today. In the contemporary era, Malay gold jewels are mainly found in the form of anklets, bracelets, rings, necklaces, pendants and earrings.

For the Malay silverware, the works of silver are fairly known for its sophisticated and fine designs. It is usually crafted by repousse, filigree and niello techniques. The common traditional Malay items usually made of silver include pillow ends, belt buckles, matt corners, stoppers for water vessels, Keris sheaths and tobacco boxes. The Awan Larat (cloud patterns) and Kerawang (Vegetal motives) are among the popular designs for Malay decorative silver pillow ends and tobacco boxes.

The usage of brassware transcends a plethora of classical Malay social classes, being used by the members of nobility and commoners alike. The popularity of brassware is heavily contributed due to its durability, quality and affordability to all. The brassware can be narrowed into two distinctions, yellow brass for functional items and white for decorative purposes. It is often meticulously hammered and craved with various decorative designs in religious and floral motives. The usage of brass however, is best known for Tepak Sireh, a ceremonial tray for betel quid and for constructing certain musical instruments such as Gongs for the classical Malay Gamelan orchestra. Additionally, other prominent traditional Malay items made from metal includes flower vases, perfume sprinkles, serving trays, cooking pots, kettle and incense burners.

=== Weaponry ===
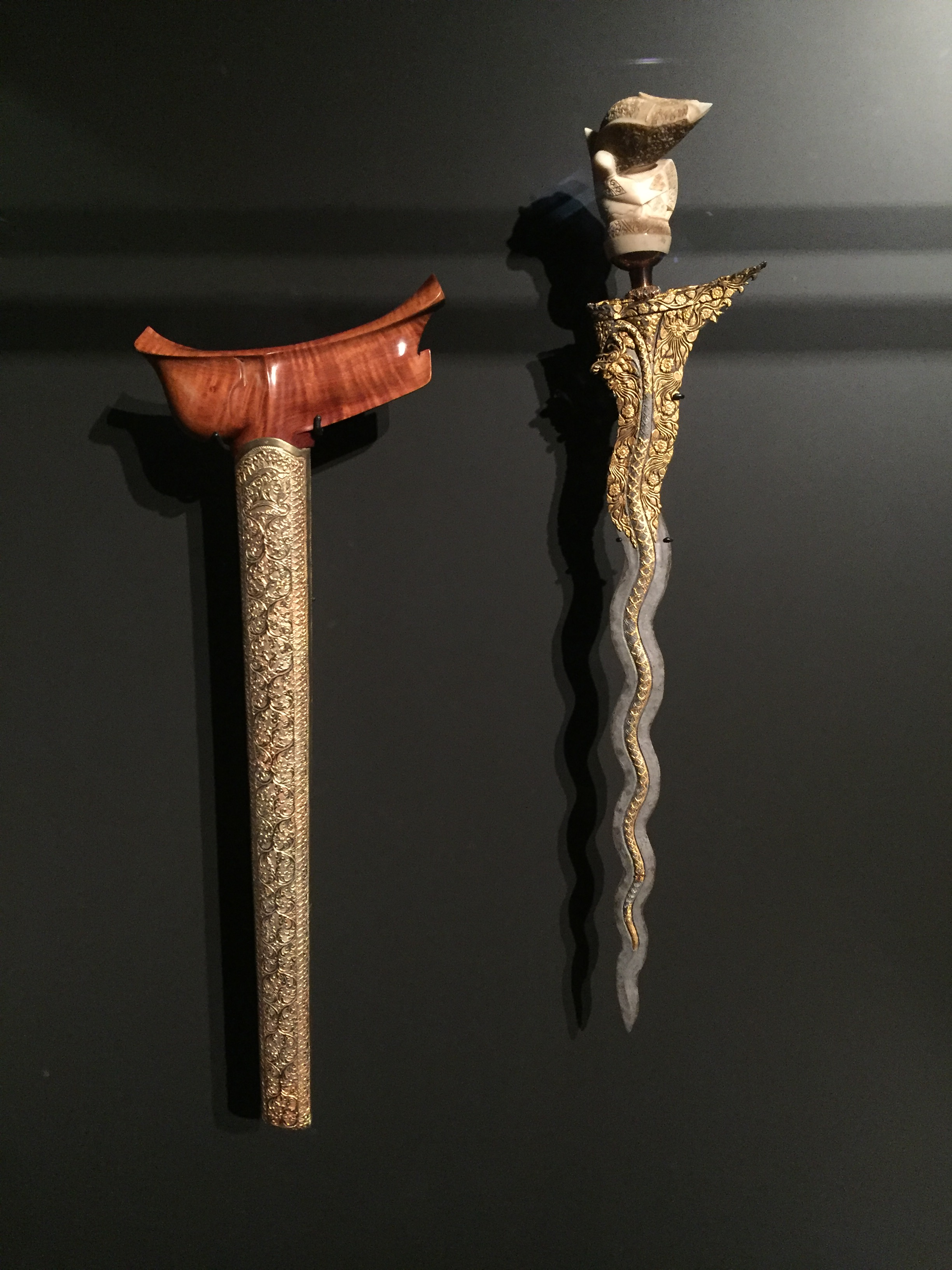
A Malay Keris, with its sheath on the left. This particular dagger was historically belonged to a Malay aristocrat from Sumatra.

The Keris is one of the most revered items of Malay weaponry. Originally developed by the Javanese down south, the spread of the kris to other nations such as Thailand, Malaysia and the Philippines, was credited to the growing influence of the Majapahit Empire in Java around the year 1492. By the time of Malacca in the 15th century, the evolution of the Malay Keris was perfected and possession of a Keris came to be regarded as in integral part of Malay culture, becoming a philosophical symbol, juxtapositioned in prestige, craftsmanship, masculinity and honour.

During the classical era, a Malay man was not seen without a Keris outside of his house. The absence of a Keris on a man was frowned upon, perceived as if he were parading naked to the public. Traditionally, a man of Malay extraction would own three types of Keris: Keris Pusaka (the Dynasty Keris, inherited from one generation to another), Keris Pangkat (the Status Keris, awarded in right of his position in Malay society) and Keris Perjuangan Dirinya (the Struggle Keris, literally defined as his personal Keris). There are many strict rules, regulations and taboos to be adhered to in owning a Keris. The blade of a Kris is usually coated with poisonous arsenic, thus crafting an excruciatingly lethal blade for its prey. Traditionally, each Keris is also regarded as possessing a spirit, known as semangat. Special rituals were to be conducted to nurture, preserve and guard the "soul" of the weapon. The spiritual approach is usually held every Malam Jumaat (Thursday night), with the blade is being purified with lime and smoked with incense, dedicated prayers and devoted mantras would be also recited upon to complement the mystic ritual.

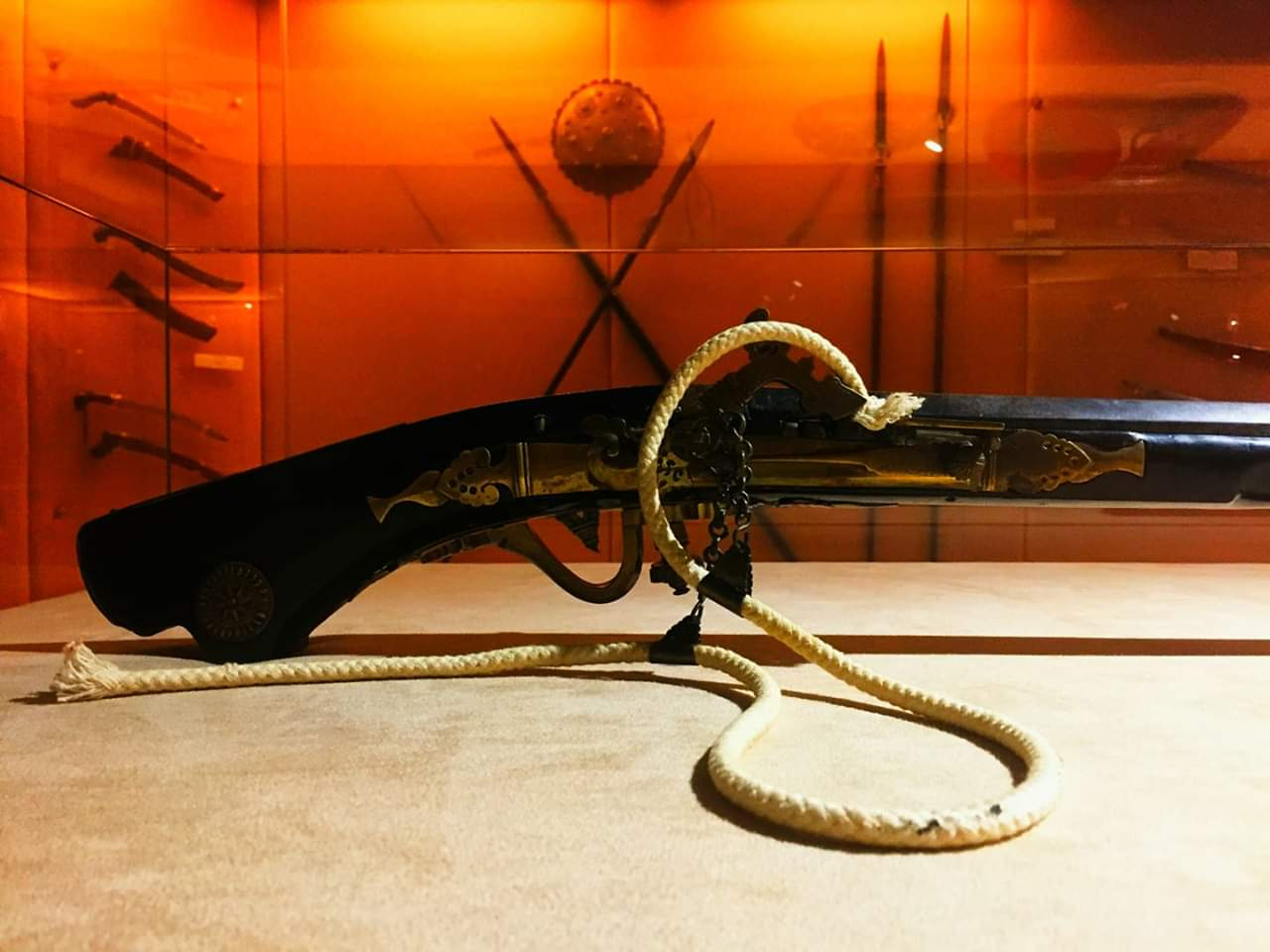
The trigger mechanism of an Istinggar, a classical Malay matchlock gun as displayed in Muzium Warisan Melayu (Malay Heritage Museum), Serdang, Selangor

The Malays and Javanese are abided by contrasting philosophical values pertaining to Keris-wearing. Traditionally, a Malay would embedded his Keris from the front, an honour that the weapon is more paramount compared to the wearer and a constant reminder that one is always equipped to combat the nemesis. The Javanese however, adhered to the principle that he should be more cautious and the Keris may solely be exercised during the time of need, thus cladding their Keris from behind. The Javanese also believed that by carrying their weapon that position, it would confuse the enemy.

Paradoxically, both groups shared a similar ideology addressing the hilt of the Keris. If the hilt faced up front, it serves as a testament that the man is prepared for a fight. Nevertheless, if the hilt is turned behind, it is an oath that the person is embracing for a reconciliation.

There are also a plethora of other forms of weaponry in the Malay arsenal, all were nevertheless equally revered in a correlating manner as the Keris. The Malays would classified the traditional weapons under 7 different structures: Tuju ("Direct", the large and heavy artillery, including the Malay cannons of Meriam, Ekor Lotong, Lela and Rentaka), Bidik ("Gun", a weapon with metal tube propelled by an ammunition, with the Malay forms of Terakor and Istingar), Setubuh ("A body", weapon in the similar dimension of a human body, referred to the Malay spears of Tongkat Panjang and Lembing), Selengan ("An arm", a large sabre from the length of the shoulders to the tips of the fingers, constituting the Malay sabre of Pedang and Sundang), Setangan ("A hand", a sword with the diameter measured from the elbow to the 3 fingers, including Badik Panjang and Tekpi), Sepegang ("A hold", smaller than the Setangan, a dagger with Keris and Badik in the category) and Segenggam ("A grab", the smallest in the category, the hand-sized blade, including Lawi Ayam, Kerambit, Kuku Macan and Kapak Binjai). Other items in the traditional Malay weaponry includes sumpit (Blowpipe) and Busur dan Panah (Bow and Arrow), which are distinct from the seven class of armaments. Additionally, the Malays also would deploy Zirah, a type of Baju Besi (armour) and Perisai (shield) as defence mechanisms during the armed conflict.

=== Traditional games ===
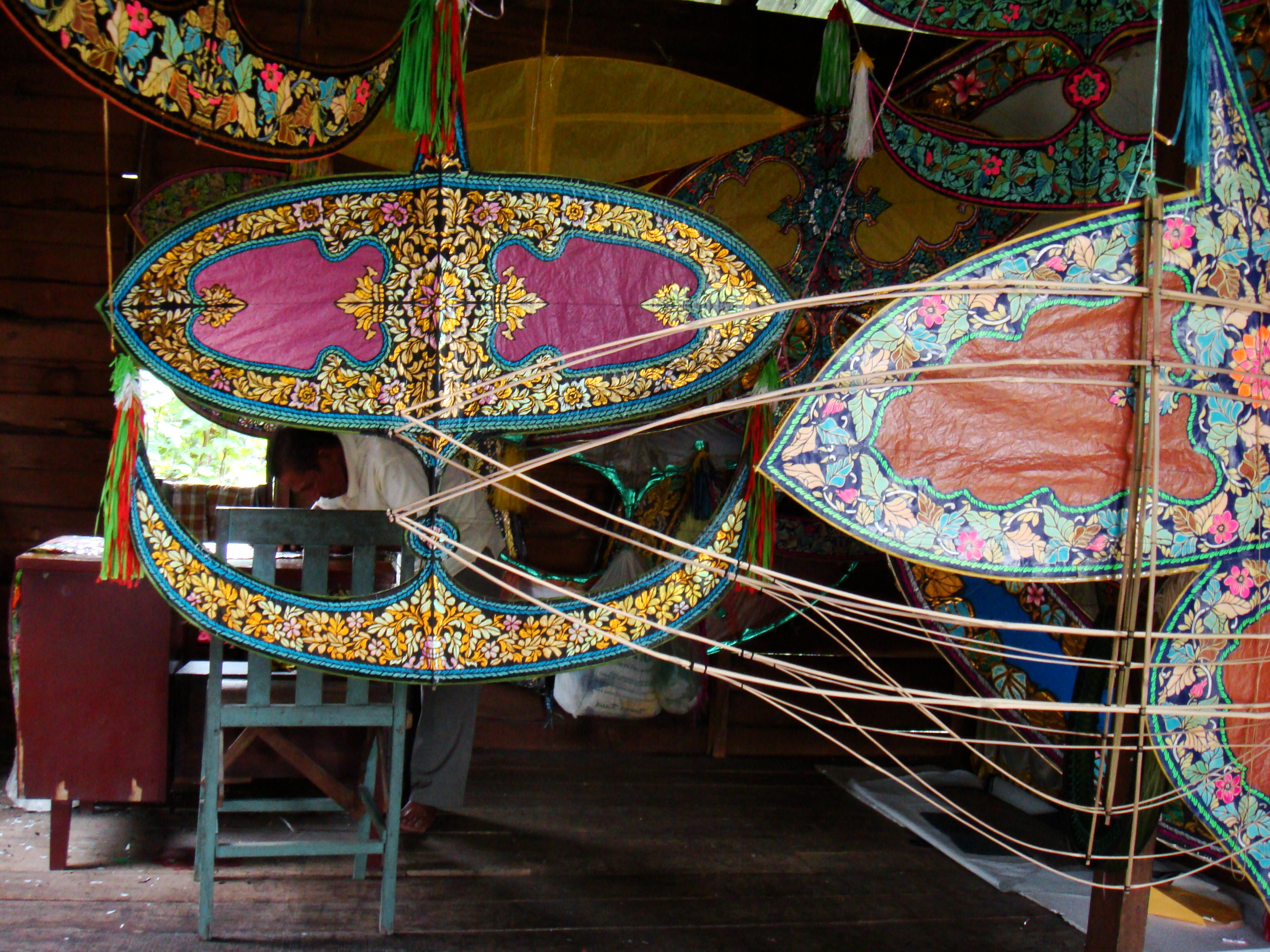
A Wau-maker's workshop in Kelantan, Malaysia. This peculiar type of kite can be found in the northeast coast of the Malay Peninsula.

Traditional Malay games usually require craft skills and manual dexterity and can be traced their origins since the days of Malacca Sultanate. Sepak Raga and kite flying are among traditional games that were mentioned in the Malay Annals being played by nobilities and royalties of the Malay sultanate.

Sepak Raga is one of the most popular Malay games and has been played for centuries. Traditionally, Sepak raga was played in circle by kicking and keeps aloft the rattan ball using any part of the body except the arms and hands. It is now recognised as Malaysia's national sport and played in the international sporting events such as Asian Games and Southeast Asian Games.

Other popular game is Gasing spinning which usually played after the harvest season. A great skill of craftsmanship is required to produce the most competitive Gasing (top), some of which spin for two hours at a time.

Possibly the most popular Malay games is the Wau (a unique kind of kite from the east coast of the Malay Peninsula) or kite flying. Wau-flying competitions take place with judges awarding points for craftsmanship (Wau are beautiful, colourful objects set on bamboo frames), sound (all Malay kites are designed to create a specific sound as they are buffeted about in the wind) and altitude.

The Malays also have a variant of Mancala board game known as Congkak. The game is played by moving stones, marbles, beads or shells around a wooden board consisting of twelve or more holes. Mancala is acknowledged as the oldest game in the world and can be traced its origin since Ancient Egypt. As the game dispersed around the globe, every culture has invented its own variation including the Malays.

=== Names and titles ===
Malay personal names are complex, reflecting the hierarchical nature of the society, and titles are considered important. Naming has undergone tremendous change, evolving with the times to reflect the different influences that the Malays been subjected to over the ages. Although some Malay names still retain parts of their indigenous Malay and Sanskrit influences, as Muslims, Malays have long favoured Arabic names as marks of their religion.

Malay names are patronymic and can consiste of up to four parts; a title, a given name, the family name, and a description of the individual's male parentage. Some given names and father's names can be composed of double names and even triple names, thereby generating a longer name. For example, one Malaysian national footballer has the full name Mohd Zaquan Adha Abdul Radzak, where 'Mohd Zaquan Adha' is his triple given name and 'Abdul Radzak' is his father's double given name.

In addition to naming system, the Malay language also has an elaborate system of titles and honorifics, which are still extensively used in Malaysia and Brunei. By applying these Malay titles to a normal Malay name, a more complex name is produced. The former Prime Minister of Malaysia has the full name Dato' Seri Mohd Najib bin Tun Haji Abdul Razak, where 'Dato' Seri' is a Malay title of honour, 'Mohd Najib' is his personal name, 'bin' is derived from an Arabic word Ibnu meaning "son of" if in case of daughter it is replaced with binti, an Arabic word "bintun" meaning "daughter of", introduces his father's titles and names, 'Tun' is a higher honour, 'Haji' denotes his father's Hajj pilgrimage to Mecca, and 'Abdul Razak' is his father's personal name. The more extremely complex Malay names however, belong to the Malay royalty. The former Yang di-Pertuan Agong of Malaysia had the full regnal name Kebawah Duli Yang Maha Mulia Seri Paduka Baginda Yang di-Pertuan Agong Al-Sultan Abdullah Ri'ayatuddin Al-Mustafa Billah Shah ibni Almarhum Sultan Haji Ahmad Shah Al-Musta'in Billah, while the reigning Sultan of Brunei is officially known as Kebawah Duli Yang Maha Mulia Paduka Seri Baginda Sultan Haji Hassanal Bolkiah Mu'izzaddin Waddaulah ibni Al-Marhum Sultan Haji Omar 'Ali Saifuddien Sa'adul Khairi Waddien.

== Sub-ethnic groups ==
The realm of Malays is depicted in green and other related sub-ethnic groups are rendered in darker or lighter green.

Although only constituting 3.4% of the total population, ethnic Malays are one of the most widely distributed ethnicities in Indonesia. As shown on the map, outside the Indonesian Archipelago, the Malay people inhabit the Malay Peninsula, forming the dominant ethnic group in Peninsular Malaysia and a significant minority in Singapore, Thailand and southern Myanmar. The corridor of Bornean Malay territories begins north from southwestern Sabah, continues with the country of Brunei Darussalam, coastal Sarawak and continues down to Kalimantan.

Ethnic group	Historical realms	Regions with significant population
Bangka and Belitung Malays		Bangka Belitung Islands
Bangkok Malays		Min Buri, Nong Chok Lam Luk Ka, Mueang Pathum Ayutthaya Province
Bengkulu Malays		Bengkulu
Berau Malays	Berau Sultanate (1377–1830); Gunung Tabur Sultanate (1810–1945); Sambaliung Sultanate (1810–1945)	Berau Regency
Buginese-Malays(assimilated Malay group of Buginese descent)	Mempawah Kingdom (1740–1950); Selangor Sultanate (1745–present); Riau-Lingga Sultanate (1824–1911)	Riau, Riau Islands; Selangor, Johor, Pahang; Singapore
Burmese Malays		Tanintharyi Division
Bruneian Malays	Bruneian Empire (7th–15th century); Brunei Sultanate (1363–present)	Brunei; Labuan, Sarawak, Sabah
Cocos Malays		Christmas Island, Cocos Islands; Sabah
Jambi Malays	Jambi Kingdom (7th century); Dharmasraya (1183–1347); Jambi Sultanate (1460–1907)	Jambi
Javanese-Malays (assimilated Malay group of Javanese descent)	Palembang Sultanate (1550–1823)	South Sumatra, North Sumatra; Selangor, Pahang, Johor; Singapore
Johorean Malays	Johor Sultanate (1528–present); Muar Sultanate (1855–1877)	Johor
Kedahan Malays	Bujang Valley Civilisation (1st century); Langkasuka (2nd–14th century); Kedah Kingdom (Kedah Tua) (7th– 12th century); Kedah Sultanate (1136–present); Setul Kingdom (1808–1916); Kubang Pasu Kingdom (1839–1864); Perlis Kingdom (1842–present)	Kedah, Perlis, Penang, Perak; Satun, Trang, Krabi
Kelantanese Malays	Red Earth Kingdom (1st–6th century); Kelantan Sultanate (1267–present); Jembal Sultanate (1638–1720)	Kelantan; Narathiwat; Besut (Terengganu)
Lahat Malays		South Sumatra
Loloan Malays		Jembrana Regency
Malaccan Malays	Malacca Sultanate (1402–1511)	Malacca
Minangkabau-Malays (assimilated Malay group of Minangkabau descent)	Dharmasraya (1183–1347); Siak Sultanate (1725–1949); Chiefdom of Negeri Sembilan (1773–present)	Riau, Riau Islands; Negeri Sembilan, Selangor, Johor, Pahang; Singapore
Northeast Sumatran Malays	Asahan Sultanate (1630–1946); Bilah Sultanate (1630–1946); Deli Sultanate (1632–1946); Langkat Sultanate (1568–1946); Serdang Sultanate (1728–1946)	North Sumatra
Pahang Malays	Old Pahang Kingdom (5th century–1454); Old Pahang Sultanate (1470–1623); Modern Pahang Kingdom (1770–1881); Modern Pahang Sultanate (1881–present)	Pahang
Palembang Malays	Srivijaya (7th–13th century); Palembang Sultanate (1550–1823)	South Sumatra
Patani Malays	Negara Sri Dharmaraja Kingdom (1st Millennium–15th century); Langkasuka (2nd–14th century); Pattani Sultanate (1516–1902); Singgora Sultanate (1603–1689); Reman Kingdom (1785–1902); Legeh Kingdom (1755–1902); Nong Chik Kingdom (1809–1902); Jalur Kingdom (1817–1902); Teluban Kingdom (1817–1902); Jering Kingdom (1817–1902)	Pattani, Yala, Narathiwat, Songkhla, Phattalung; Kedah, Kelantan, Perak
Perakian Malays	Gangga Negara (2nd – 11th century); Perak Sultanate (1528–present)	Perak
Riau Malays	Kuntu Kampar Sultanate (1234–1933); Indragiri Sultanate (1298–1945); Rokan Sultanate (1569–1940); Pelalawan Sultanate (1791–1946); Riau-Lingga Sultanate (1824–1911)	Riau, Riau Islands, Pasaman Regency, Lima Puluh Kota Regency
Sarawakian Malays	Santubong Kingdom (7th century); Samarahan Kingdom (13th century); Saribas Kingdom (15th century); Banting Kingdom (16th century); Sarawak Sultanate (1598–1641)	Sarawak
Selangorean Malays	Selangor Sultanate (1745–present)	Selangor
Singaporean Malays	Kingdom of Singapura (1299–1398)	Singapore
Tamiang Malays	Bukit Karang Kingdom (1023–1330); Benua Tamiang Sultanate (1330–1528)	Aceh Tamiang Regency
Terengganuan Malays	Terengganu Sultanate (1708–present); Besut Kingdom (1780–1899)	Terengganu; Kuantan City (Pahang)
West Kalimantan Malays	Landak Kingdom (1292–1962); Matan Kingdom (1590–1948); Mempawah Kingdom (1740–1950); Pontianak Sultanate (1771–1950); Sambas Sultanate (1675–1944); Sanggau Kingdom (1310–1960); Sintang Kingdom (1365–1950); Tanjungpura Kingdom (880–1590)	West Kalimantan

== See also ==
- Anti-Malay sentiment, racial prejudice against ethnic Malays
- Ketuanan Melayu (Malay Supremacy)
- Malayness
- Malay world
- Malay diaspora
- List of Malay people
- Malay folklore
- Malay Islamic Monarchy, the national philosophy of Brunei
- Malay tricolour
- Malay units of measurement
- Ghosts in Malay culture

== Bibliography ==
- Abd. Rahman Ismail (2008), Seni Silat Melayu: Sejarah, Perkembangan dan Budaya, Kuala Lumpur: Dewan Bahasa dan Pustaka, ISBN 978-983-62-9934-5
- Abdulla, M. A.; et al. (HUGO Pan-Asian SNP Consortium) (December 2009). "Mapping Human Genetic Diversity in Asia". Science. 326 (5959): 1541–1545. Bibcode:2009Sci...326.1541.. doi:10.1126/science.1177074. PMID 20007900. S2CID 34341816.
- Abu Talib Ahmad; Tan, Liok Ee (2003), New terrains in Southeast Asian history, Singapore: Ohio University press, ISBN 978-9971-69-269-8
- Ahir, Diwan Chand (1995), A Panorama of Indian Buddhism: Selections from the Maha Bodhi journal, 1892–1992, Sri Satguru Publications, ISBN 978-81-7030-462-3
- Ahmad Salehuddin (2009), Serampang dua belas, Tari Tradisional Kesultanan Serdang, archived from the original on 15 June 2012
- Alexander, James (2006), Malaysia Brunei & Singapore, New Holland Publishers, ISBN 978-1-86011-309-3
- Ali, Tongkat (1 February 2010). "Negeri Rahman, hilangnya sebutir permata" [State of Rahman, the loss of a gem] (in Malay). Archived from the original on 19 August 2011.
- Amin, Tarek Abd El-Hamid Ahmed (1995). Anglo-German Rivalry in the Malay Peninsula and Siam, 1870–1909 (MSc). Universiti Malaya. Archived from the original on 25 September 2022.
- Ananta, Aris; Arifin, Evi Nurvidya; Hasbullah, M Sairi; Handayani, Nur Budi; Pramono, Agus (2015). Demography of Indonesia's Ethnicity. Institute of Southeast Asian Studies. ISBN 978-981-4519-87-8.
- Anderbeck, Karl (2002). Suku Batin – A Proto-Malay People? Evidence from Historical Linguistics. The Sixth International Symposium on Malay/Indonesian Linguistics, 3 – 5 August 2002, Nirwana Resort Hotel, Bintan Island, Riau, Indonesia. Archived from the original on 4 March 2016.
- Anuar Nik Mahmud, Nik (1999), Sejarah Perjuangan Melayu Pattani, Bangi: Penerbit Universiti Kebangsaan Malaysia, ISBN 978-967-942-443-0
- Andaya, Barbara Watson; Andaya, Leonard Yuzon (1984), A History of Malaysia, London: Palgrave Macmillan, ISBN 978-0-333-27672-3
- Angahsunan (16 July 2017). "Pusaka, Rahsia Dan Dzat Keris". The Patriots. Archived from the original on 23 September 2017.
- Azmi Arifin (2015), Traditional Malay Pottery of Kuala Kangsar: Its History and Development, School of Humanities and Sciencesm, Universiti Sains Malaysia
- Baer, A. S. (Fall 1999). "Eden in the East, Stephen Oppenheimer. London: Weidenfeld and Nicolson, 1998". Book Reviews. Asian Perspectives. 38 (2): 256–258. Archived from the original on 25 September 2022.
- Barnard, Timothy P. (2004), Contesting Malayness: Malay identity across boundaries, Singapore: Singapore University press, ISBN 978-9971-69-279-7
- Barrington, Lowell (2006), After Independence: Making and Protecting the Nation in Postcolonial and Postcommunist States, University of Michigan Press, ISBN 978-0-472-06898-2
- Bolton, Kingsley; Hutton, Christopher (2000), Triad societies: western accounts of the history, sociology and linguistics of Chinese secret societies, vol. 5, London: Routledge, ISBN 978-0-415-24397-1
- Boyd, Kelly (1999), Encyclopedia of historians and historical writing, vol. 2, London: Fitzroy Darborn Publishers, ISBN 978-1-884964-33-6
- Brown, Keith; Ogilvie, Sarah (2009), Concise encyclopedia of languages of the world, Elsevier Science, ISBN 978-0-08-087774-7
- Burgat, François (2003), Face to face with political Islam (L'islamisme en face), New York: I.B Tauris & Co. Ltd, ISBN 978-1-86064-212-8
- Joseph Norbert Frans Marie à Campo (2002). Engines of Empire: Steamshipping and State Formation in Colonial Indonesia. Hilversum: Verloren. ISBN 978-9-06550738-9.
- Chew, Melanie (1999), The Presidential Notes: A biography of President Yusof bin Ishak, Singapore: SNP Publications, ISBN 978-981-4032-48-3
- Chihara, Daigorō (1996), Hindu-Buddhist architecture in Southeast Asia, BRILL, ISBN 978-90-04-10512-6
- Cikgu Paklong (2017), Tembikar, Scribd, archived from the original on 3 August 2020
- Clyne, Michael G. (1992), Pluricentric languages: differing norms in different nations, De Gruyter Mouton, ISBN 978-3-11-012855-0
- Cœdès, George (1968). The Indianized states of Southeast Asia. University of Hawaii Press. ISBN 978-0-8248-0368-1. Archived from the original on 23 January 2023.
- Colling, Patricia, ed. (1973), Dissertation Abstracts International, A-The Humanities and Social Sciences, vol. 33, New York: Xerox University Microfilms, #8, ISSN 0419-4209 (Abstracts of Dissertations Available on Microfilm or as Xerographic Reproductions February 1973)
- Cordier, Henri (2009), Ser Marco Polo; notes and addenda to Sir Henry Yule's edition, containing the results of recent research and discovery, Bibliolife, ISBN 978-1-110-77685-6
- Crawfurd, John (1856). A Descriptive Dictionary of the Indian Islands and Adjacent Countries. London: Bradbury and Evans.
- Deka, Phani (2007), The great Indian corridor in the east, Mittal Publications, ISBN 978-81-8324-179-3
- Devan, Subhadra (2010), New interest in an older Lembah Bujang, NST, archived from the original on 1 December 2012
- Draeger, Donn F. (1992), Weapons and fighting arts of Indonesia, Tuttle Publishing, ISBN 978-0-8048-1716-5
- Economic Planning Unit (Malaysia) (2010), Population by sex, ethnic group and age, Malaysia,2010 (PDF), archived from the original (PDF) on 22 July 2011
- Esposito, John L. (1999), The Oxford History of Islam, New York: Oxford University Press, ISBN 978-0-19-510799-9
- Europa Publications Staff (2002), Far East and Australasia (34th edition), Routledge, ISBN 978-1-85743-133-9
- Farrer, D. S. (2009), Shadows of the Prophet: Martial Arts and Sufi Mysticism, Springer, ISBN 978-1-4020-9355-5
- Ford, R. Clyde (1899), "Malay Literature", Popular Science Monthly, 55
- Ganguly, Šumit (1997), Government Policies and Ethnic Relations in Asia and the Pacific, MIT press, ISBN 978-0-262-52245-8
- Gerini, Gerolamo Emilio (1974), Researches on Ptolemy's geography of eastern Asia (further India and Indo-Malay archipelago), New Delhi: Oriental Books Reprint Corporation, OCLC 1068575751
- Ghulam Sarwar Yousof (1997), The Malay Shadow Play: An Introduction, The Asian Centre, ISBN 978-983-9499-02-5
- Gibson-Hill, C. A. (July 1953). "Notes on the old Cannon found in Malaya, and known to be of Dutch origin". Journal of the Malayan Branch of the Royal Asiatic Society. 26 (1): 145–174. JSTOR 41502911.
- Gopal, Lallanji (2000), The economic life of northern India: c. A.D. 700–1200, Motilal Banarsidass, ISBN 978-81-208-0302-2
- Green, Thomas A. (2001), Martial arts of the world: An Encyclopedia., Santa Barbara: ABC-CLIO Inc, ISBN 978-1-57607-150-2
- Gulrose Karim (1990), Muslim identity and Islam: misinterpreted in the contemporary world, Information Malaysia 1990–91 Yearbook, Kuala Lumpur: Berita Publishing Sdn. Bhd, ISBN 978-81-7827-165-1
- Halimi, Ahmad Jelani & Pitchai, Mohd Yusoff Mydin (2016). "Setoi (Setul) Mambang Segara Dalam Lintasan Sejarah Negeri-Negeri Melayu Utara". Jurnal Perspektif. 8 (2): 123–134. ISSN 1985-496X. Archived from the original on 16 September 2017.
- Hall, Daniel George Edward (1981), History of South East Asia, Macmillan, ISBN 978-0-333-24163-9
- Hall, Thomas D. (2017), Comparing Globalizations Historical and World-Systems Approaches, Springer, ISBN 978-3-319-68219-8, archived from the original on 31 March 2023
- Harper, Timothy Norman (2001), The End of Empire and the Making of Malaya, London: Cambridge University Press, ISBN 978-0-521-00465-7
- Hassan, Hanisa (2016). "A Study on the Development of Baju Kurung Design in the Context of Cultural Changes in Modern Malaysia" (PDF). Wacana Seni Journal of Arts Discourse. 15. Perpustakaan Negara Malaysia: 63–94. doi:10.21315/ws2016.15.3. Archived (PDF) from the original on 22 December 2018.
- He, Baogang; Galligan, Brian; Inoguchi, Takashi (2007), Federalism in Asia, London: Edward Elgar Publications, ISBN 978-1-84720-140-9
- Henket, Hubert-Jan; Heynen, Hilde (2002), Back from utopia: the challenge of the modern movement, Rotterdam: 010 Publishers, ISBN 978-90-6450-483-9
- Herwig, Holger H. (1980). "Luxury' Fleet": The Imperial German Navy 1888-1918 (1st ed.). London; Boston: Allen & Unwin. ISBN 978-0-04943023-5.
- Hunter, William Wilson; Roberts, Paul Ernest (2010), A History of British India: To the Overthrow of the English in the Spice Archipelago, Nabu Press, ISBN 978-1-145-70716-0
- Husain, M. G. (2007), Muslim identity and Islam: misinterpreted in the contemporary world, New Delhi: Manak Publications, ISBN 978-81-7827-165-1
- Hussin Mutalib (2008), Islam in Southeast Asia, Singapore: Institute of Southeast Asian Studies, ISBN 978-981-230-758-3
- I Ching (2005), Takakusu, Junjiro (ed.), A Record of the Buddhist Religion As Practised in India and the Malay Archipelago (A.D. 671–695), Asian Educational Services, ISBN 978-81-206-1622-6
- IBP (2007), Brunei Sultan Haji Hassanal Bolkiah Mu'izzaddin Waddaulah Handbook, Washington DC: International Business Publications, ISBN 978-1-4330-0444-5
- Irma Musliana (2016), Kenapa Bilah Keris Bengkok? Sejarah Keris Melayu Yang Kita Tidak Pernah Dengar., archived from the original on 1 December 2017
- Jaaffar, Johan; Hussain, Safian; Ahmad, Mohd Thani (1992), History of Modern Malay Literature, vol. 2, Kuala Lumpur: Dewan Bahasa dan Pustaka & Ministry of Education (Malaysia), ISBN 978-983-62-2745-4
- James, Michael (1994), "Black Belt", Black Belt. Buyer's Guide, Rainbow Publications, ISSN 0277-3066
- Jamil Abu Bakar (2002), A design guide of public parks in Malaysia, Kuala Lumpur: Penerbit UTM, ISBN 978-983-52-0274-2
- Jermsawatdi, Promsak (1989), Thai art with Indian influences, Abhinav Publications, ISBN 978-81-7017-090-7
- Johns, Anthony Hearle; Lahoud, Nelly (2005), Islam in world politics, New York: Routledge, ISBN 978-0-415-32411-3
- Joseph, Suad; Najmabadi, Afsaneh (2006), Economics, Education, Mobility And Space (Encyclopedia of women & Islamic cultures), Brill Academic Publishers, ISBN 978-90-04-12820-0=
- Leyden, John (1821), Malay Annals: Translated from the Malay Language, London: Longman, Hurst, Rees, Orme, and Brown
- Littrup, Lisbeth (1996), Identity in Asian literature, Richmond: Nordic Institute of Asian Studies, ISBN 978-0-7007-0367-8
- Lockard, Craig A. (2009), Southeast Asia in world history, New York: Oxford University Press, ISBN 978-0-19-533811-9
- Lumholtz, Carl Sofus (2004), Through Central Borneo, Kessinger publishing, ISBN 978-1-4191-8996-8
- Majlis Kebudayaan Negeri Kedah (1986), Intisari kebudayaan Melayu Kedah: Kumpulan rencana mengenai kebudayaan Negeri Kedah, Majlis Kebudayaan Negeri Kedah
- Marshall Cavendish (2007), World and Its Peoples: Eastern and Southern Asia, New York: Marshall Cavendish, ISBN 978-0-7614-7631-3
- Marzuki bin Haji Mohd Seruddin (2009), Program Kerjasama Brunei-Malaysia tingkatkan seni Budaya, Pelita Brunei
- Matusky, Patricia Ann (1993), Malaysian shadow play and music: continuity of an oral tradition, Oxford University Press, ISBN 978-967-65-3048-6
- Maznah Mohammad (1996), The Malay handloom weavers: a study of the rise and decline of traditional manufacture, Singapore: Institute of Southeast Asian Studies, ISBN 978-981-3016-99-6
- McNair, Sylvia (2002), Malaysia (Enchantment of the World. Second Series), Children's Press, ISBN 978-0-516-21009-4
- Melayu Online (2005), Melayu Online.com's Theoretical Framework, archived from the original on 21 October 2012
- Melebek, Abdul Rashid; Moain, Amat Juhari (2006), Sejarah Bahasa Melayu ("History of the Malay Language"), Utusan Publications & Distributors, ISBN 978-967-61-1809-7
- Miksic, John N.; Goh, Geok Yian (2017), Ancient Southeast Asia, London: Routledge
- Milner, Anthony (2010), The Malays (The Peoples of South-East Asia and the Pacific), Wiley-Blackwell, ISBN 978-1-4443-3903-1
- Ministry of Culture, Singapore (1973), "Singapore: facts and pictures", Singapore Facts and Figures, ISSN 0217-7773
- Mohamad Tajuddin Haji Mohamad Rasdi (2005), The architectural heritage of the Malay world: the traditional houses, Skudai, Johor Darul Ta'zim: Penerbit Universiti Teknologi Malaysia, ISBN 978-983-52-0357-2
- Mohamed Anwar Omar Din (2011), Asal Usul Orang Melayu: Menulis Semula Sejarahnya (The Malay Origin: Rewrite Its History), Jurnal Melayu, Universiti Kebangsaan Malaysia, archived from the original on 9 December 2019
- Mohd Fauzi Yaacob (2009), Malaysia: Transformasi dan perubahan sosial, Kuala Lumpur: Arah Pendidikan Sdn Bhd, ISBN 978-967-323-132-4
- Mohd. Zamberi A. Malek. (1994), Patani dalam tamadun Melayu, Pendeta Discovery Universiti Malaya, ISBN 978-983-62-4121-4
- Mok, Opalyn (9 June 2017). "Archaeologists search for a king in Sungai Batu". Malay Mail. Archived from the original on 1 December 2017.
- Moore, Wendy (1998), West Malaysia and Singapore, Singapore: Periplus Editions (HK) Ltd, ISBN 978-962-593-179-1
- Mukerjee, Radhakamal (1984), The culture and art of India, Coronet Books Inc, ISBN 978-81-215-0114-9
- Muljana, Slamet (1981), Kuntala, Sriwijaya Dan Suwarnabhumi (in Indonesian), Jakarta: Yayasan Idayu, OCLC 565235680
- Muljana, Slamet (2006), Stapel, Frederik Willem (ed.), Sriwijaya (in Indonesian), Yogyakarta: LKiS Pelangi Aksara, ISBN 978-979-8451-62-1
- Munoz, Paul Michel (2006), Early Kingdoms of the Indonesian Archipelago and the Malay Peninsula, Singapore: Editions Didier Millet, ISBN 978-981-4155-67-0
- Murdock, George Peter (1969), Studies in the science of society, Singapore: Books for Libraries Press, ISBN 978-0-8369-1157-2
- Na'im, Akhsan; Syaputra, Hendry (2010), Sumarwanto; Iriantono, Tono (eds.), Kewarganegaraan, Suku Bangsa, Agama, dan Bahasa Sehari-hari Penduduk Indonesia – Hasil Sensus Penduduk 2010 [Indonesian Citizens' Nationality, Ethnicity, Religion, and Everyday Language – Results of the 2010 Population Census] (PDF) (in Indonesian), Jakarta, Indonesia: Badan Pusat Statistik [Central Bureau of Statistics], ISBN 978-979-064-417-5, archived from the original (PDF) on 12 July 2017
- Niza, Syefiri Moniz Mohd. (10 June 2016). "Keris masih simbol paling penting". Utusan online. Archived from the original on 1 December 2017.
- Noor, Farish Ahmad; Khoo, Eddin (2003), Spirit of wood: the art of Malay woodcarving: works by master carvers from Kelantan, Terengganu, and Pattani, Singapore: Periplus Editions, ISBN 978-0-7946-0103-4
- O'Reilly, Dougald J. W. (2007), Early civilizations of Southeast Asia, Rowman Altamira Press, ISBN 978-0-7591-0278-1
- Ooi, Keat Gin (2004), Southeast Asia: a historical encyclopedia, from Angkor Wat to East Timor, ABC-CLIO, ISBN 978-1-57607-770-2, archived from the original on 16 January 2023
- Oppenheimer, Stephen (2006). "The 'Austronesian' Story and Farming-language Dispersals: Caveats on the Timing and Independence in Proxy Lines of Evidence from the Indo-European Model". In Bacas, Elizabeth A.; Glover, Ian C.; Pigott, Vincent C. (eds.). Uncovering Southeast Asia's Past. Singapore: NUS Press. pp. 65–73. ISBN 978-9971-69-351-0.
- Othman, Mohd. Aris Hj. (1983), The dynamics of Malay identity, Penerbit Universiti Kebangsaan Malaysia, ISBN 978-967-942-009-8
- Pande, Govind Chandra (2006). India's Interaction with Southeast Asia: History of Science, Philosophy and Culture in Indian Civilization, Vol. 1, Part 3. Munshiram Manoharlal. ISBN 978-81-87586-24-1.
- Pearson, Michael (2015), Trade, Circulation, and Flow in the Indian Ocean World, Palgrave Series in Indian Ocean World Studies, Palgrave Macmillan, ISBN 978-1-137-56624-9, archived from the original on 31 March 2023
- Ramli, Rashahar (1999). "Bab Dua: Selatan Thailand, Changwat Narathiwat dan Kawasan Kajian" [Chapter Two: South Thailand, Changwat Narathiwat and Study Area] (PDF). Masyarakat Melayu dan penanaman padi di Selatan Thailand: kajian kes di sebuah mubaan dalam Wilayah / Narathiwat [The Malay community and rice cultivation in southern Thailand: a case study in a regency in the Regions / Narathiwat] (Thesis) (in Malay). Archived from the original on 4 December 2020 – via Universiti Utara Malaysia Library.
- Razak, Aidila (24 January 2012). "Geneticist clarifies role of Proto-Malays in human origin". Malaysia Kini. Archived from the original on 27 July 2018.
- Richmond, Simon (2007), Malaysia, Singapore & Brunei, Lonely Planet publications, ISBN 978-1-74059-708-1
- Ricklefs, M.C. (1991). A Modern History of Indonesia, 2nd edition. MacMillan. ISBN 0-333-57690-X.
- Ryan, Neil Joseph (1976), A History of Malaysia and Singapore, London: Oxford University Press, ISBN 978-0-19-580302-0
- Said, Ismail (2002). "Visual Composition of Malay Woodcarvings in Vernacular House of Peninsular Malaysia" (PDF). Jurnal Teknologi. 37 (B). University Teknologi Malaysia: 43–52. Archived from the original (PDF) on 22 July 2011.
- Said, Sanib (October 2012). "Sejarah Awal Kepulauan Melayu:Lima Buah Negeri Warisan Sarawak yang Hilang". CREAM – Current Research in Malaysia. 1 (1). University Malaysia Sarawak: 35–44.
- Said, Ismail (May 2005). "Criteria for Selecting Timber Species in Malay Woodcarving". Journal of Asian Architecture and Building Engineering. 4 (1): 17–23. doi:10.3130/jaabe.4.17. S2CID 108510191.
- Sarkar, Himansu Bhusan (1970), Some contributions of India to the ancient civilisation of Indonesia and Malaysia, Calcutta: Punthi Pustak, ISBN 978-0-19-580302-0
- Sheikh Shamsuddin (2005), The Malay art of self-defense: Silat Seni Gayung, Berkeley: North Atlantic Books, ISBN 978-1-55643-562-1
- Sneddon, James N. (2003), The Indonesian language: its history and role in modern society, University of New South Wales Press, ISBN 978-0-86840-598-8
- Soares, Pedro; et al. (June 2008). "Climate Change and Postglacial Human Dispersals in Southeast Asia". Molecular Biology and Evolution. 25 (6): 1209–18. doi:10.1093/molbev/msn068. PMID 18359946.
- Srinivasa, Kodaganallur Ramaswami (2003), Asian variations in Ramayana, Singapore: Sahitya Academy, ISBN 978-81-260-1809-3
- Stearns, Peter N. (2001), The Encyclopedia of World History, vol. 1, Houghton Mifflin Harcourt, ISBN 978-0-395-65237-4
- Suryadinata, Leo (2000), Nationalism & Globalization: East & West, Institute of Southeast Asian Studies, ISBN 978-981-230-078-2
- Sweeney, Amin (1987), A full hearing:orality and literacy in the Malay world, Berkeley: University of California Press, ISBN 978-0-520-05910-8
- Syed Husin Ali (2008), The Malays, their problems and future, Kuala Lumpur: The Other Press Sdn Bhd, ISBN 978-983-9541-62-5
- Tan, Liok Ee (1988), The Rhetoric of Bangsa and Minzu, Monash Asia Institute, ISBN 978-0-86746-909-7
- TED (1999), Taman Negara Rain Forest Park and Tourism, archived from the original on 9 June 2010
- Teeuw, Andries (1959), The history of the Malay language. A preliminary survey, Royal Netherlands Institute of Southeast Asian and Caribbean Studies, archived from the original on 5 March 2016
- Terrell, John Edward (August–October 1999). "Think Globally, Act Locally". Current Anthropology. 40 (4): 559–560. doi:10.1086/200054. S2CID 224792124.
- Tirtosudarmo, Riwanto (March 2005). The Orang Melayu and Orang Jawa in the 'Lands Below the Winds' (PDF) (Working paper). CRISE: Centre for Research on Inequality, Human Security and Ethnicity. CRISE Working Paper 14. Archived (PDF) from the original on 26 November 2020.
- Umaiyah Haji Omar (2007). Language and writing system of Bangkok Melayu (PDF). International Conference on Minority Languages and Writing Systems held on 23–26 November 2007 in Beijing, China. Archived (PDF) from the original on 24 February 2021.
- Umaiyah Haji Omar (2003), The Assimilation of the Bangkok-Melayu Communities, Asian Scholarship Foundation, archived from the original on 18 September 2012
- Van Beek, Steve; Invernizzi, Luca (1999), The arts of Thailand, New York: Tuttle Publishing, ISBN 978-962-593-262-0
- Van der Putten, Jan; Cody, Mary Kilcline (2009), Lost Times and Untold Tales from the Malay World, Singapore: National University of Singapore press, ISBN 978-9971-69-454-8
- Winarno, Bondan (21 June 2010). "Gulai Ketam, Asam-Asam Pedas". Detik Food. Archived from the original on 23 June 2010.
- Winstedt, Richard Olaf (1925), Shaman Saiva and Sufi (2008 edition), London: BiblioLife
- Wolters, Oliver William (1999), History, culture, and region in Southeast Asian perspectives, Singapore: Cornell University Southeast Asia Program Publications, ISBN 978-0-87727-725-5
- Wong, Hoy Kee (1973), Comparative studies in Southeast Asian education, Heinemann Educational Books (Asia), ISBN 978-0-686-60339-9
- Wright, John (2007), The New York Times Almanac 2001, New York: The New York Times Company, ISBN 978-1-57958-348-4
- Wright, Thomas (2004), The travels of Marco Polo, the Venetian: the translation of Marsden revised, with a selection of his notes, Kessinger Publishing, LLC, ISBN 978-1-4191-8573-1
- Yunos, Rozan; Begawan, Bandar Seri (24 October 2011). "In search of Brunei Malays outside Brunei". Brunei Times. Archived from the original on 14 May 2016.
- Zakaria, Faizal Izzani (3 September 2016). "Keris jiwa Melayu dan Nusantara". Utusan online. Archived from the original on 1 December 2017.
- Zaki Ragman (2003), Gateway to Malay culture, Singapore: Asiapac Books Pte Ltd, ISBN 978-981-229-326-8
- Ziegler, Oswald Leopol (1972), The world and south east Asia, Oswald Ziegler Enterprises, ISBN 978-0-909586-03-4
