= Dance in Malaysia =

Dance in Malaysia encompasses dance traditions from many different ethic origins. Malay dances include Dance Dramas, Court Dramas, and Folk Dances. Other dances come from Javanese, Orang Asli, Portuguese, Siamese, Dayak, Moro, and Chinese traditions. This article includes a list of dances, organised by ethic origin.

== List of dances ==
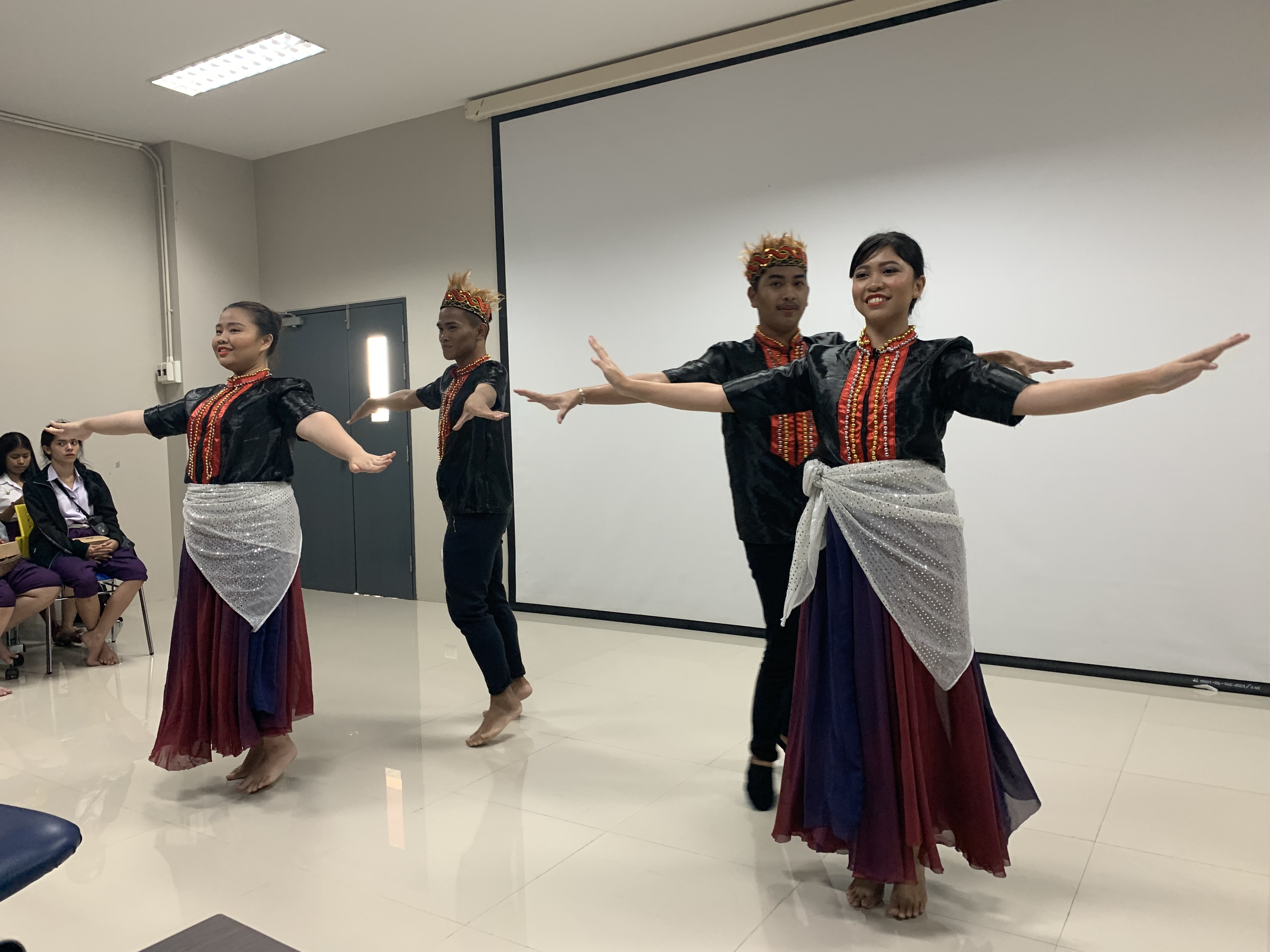
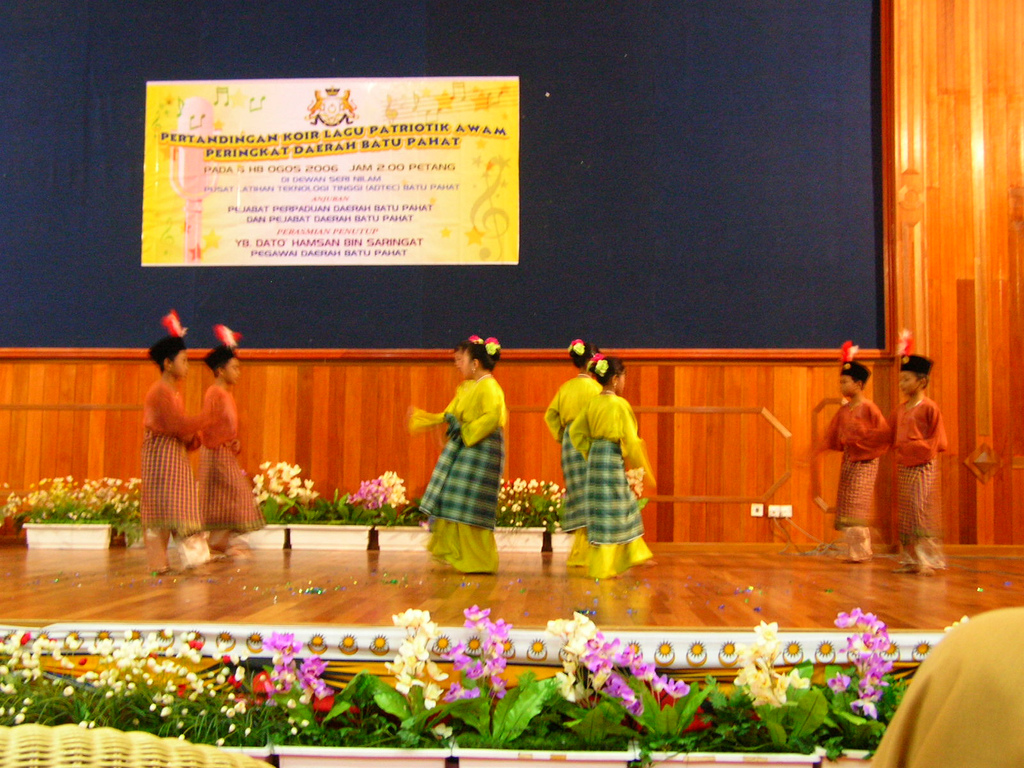
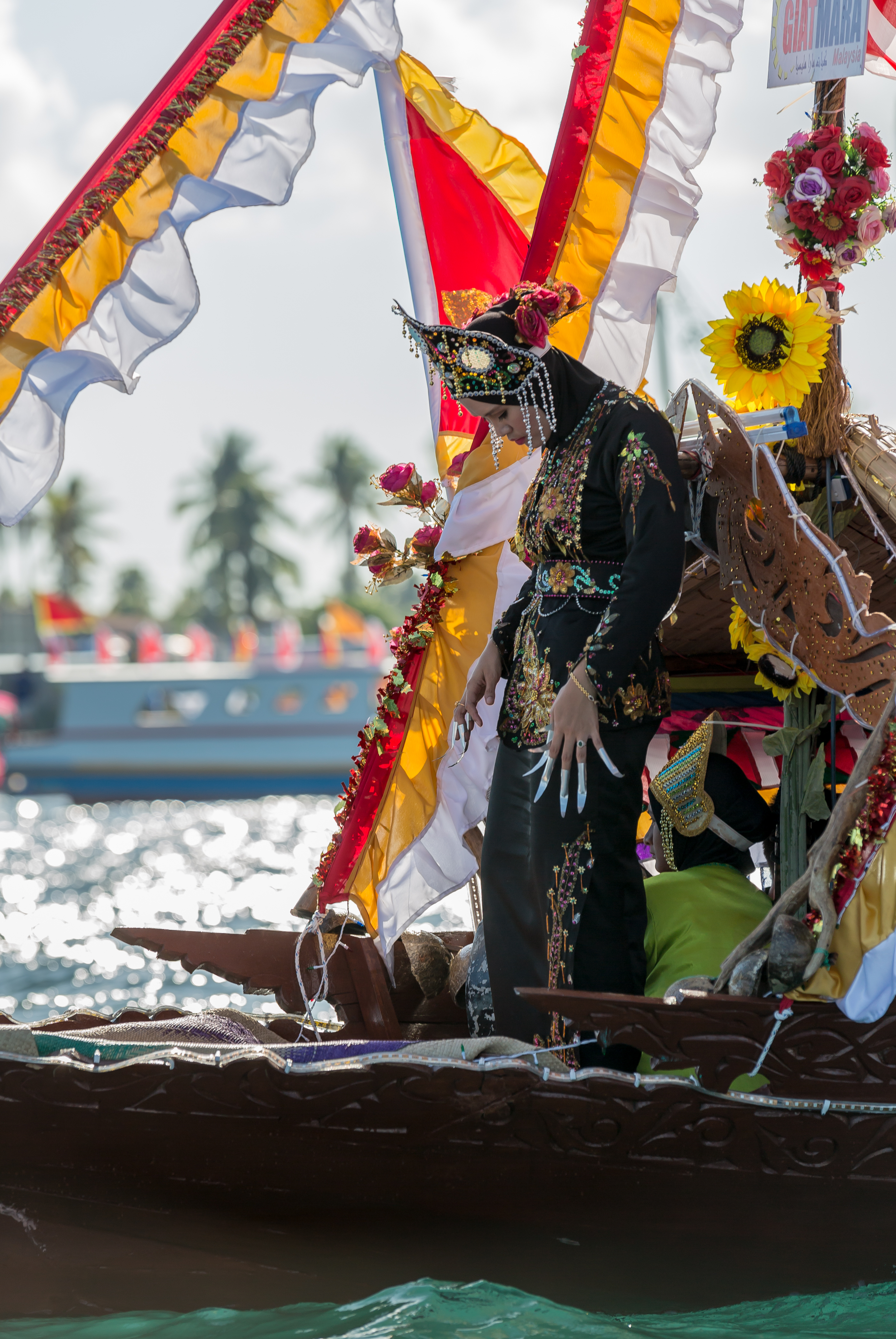
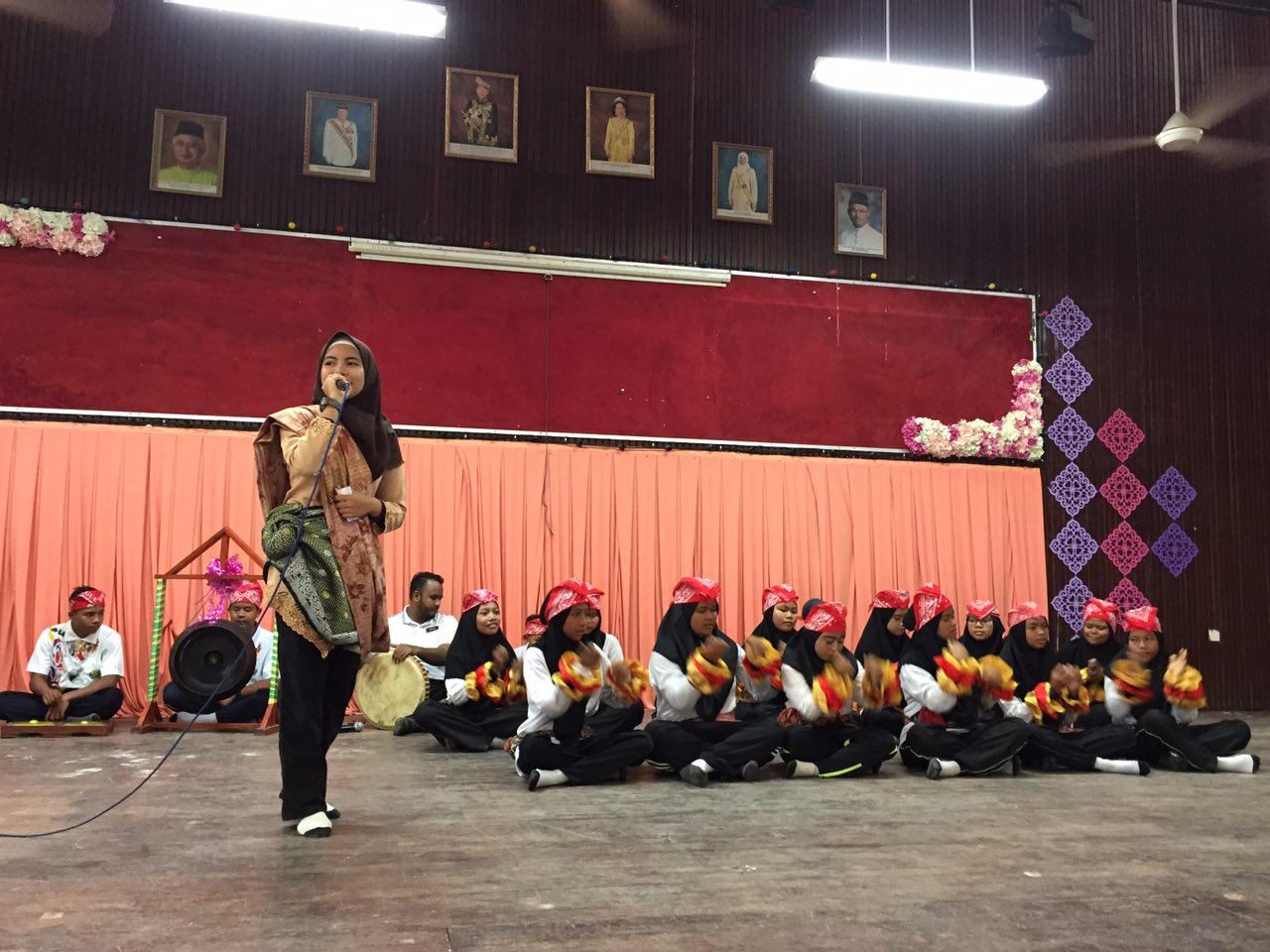
Malaysian dances. From left to right: Sumazau of West Coast Sabah, Zapin of Johor, Bangsawan of Penang, Pangalay of East Coast Sabah, and Dikir Barat of Kelantan.

=== Malay Dance-Dramas ===
- Jikey
- Mek Mulung
- Bangsawan
- Mak Yong
- Randai

=== Malay Court Dances ===
- Mak Inang
- Terinai
- Asyik
- Inai
- Joget Gamelan

=== Malay Folk Dances ===
- Boria
- Ghazal Parti
- Canggung
- Dabus
- Dikir Barat
- Ulek Mayang
- Rodat
- Saba
- Joget
- Joget Lambak
- Asli
- Silat
- Zapin
- Masri
- Indang
- Lilin
- Piring
- Dansa

=== Javanese Folk Dances ===
- Kuda Kepang
- Barongan
- Ronggeng

=== Orang Asli ===
- Sewang

=== Portuguese ===
- Branyo

=== Siam ===
- Menora
- Rambong
- Tomoi

=== Dayak, Kadazan-Dusun, Murut, Rungus and Paitan ===
- Magunatip
- Ngajat
- Sumazau
- Lansaran
- Datun Julud

=== Moro ===
- Pangalay

=== Chinese ===
- Fan dance
- Lion dance
- Dragon dance
- 24 Festive Drum

=== Indian ===
- Bharathanatyam
- Odissi
- Bhangra

== See also ==
- Culture of Malaysia
- Malays (ethnic group)
