= Ramanathan Vengadesan =

Malaysian diplomat

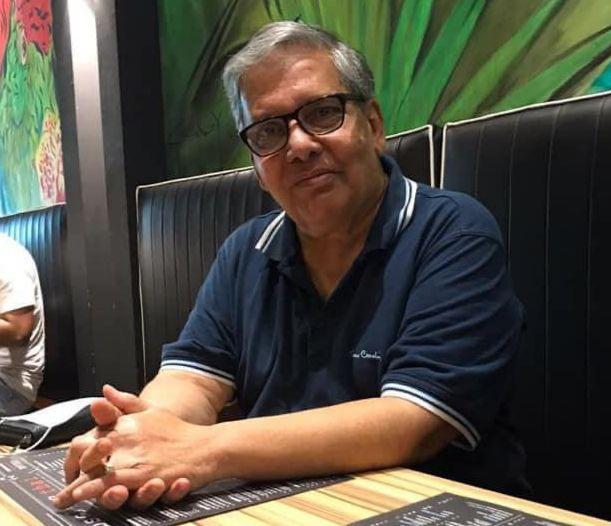

Ramanathan Vengadesan (born June 25, 1945) is a retired Malaysian diplomat who was Malaysia's Ambassador to Italy from 1997 to 2000. In 35 years with the Malaysian Foreign Service, he also served as Ambassador to Mali and Senegal, as well as High Commissioner to Namibia.

He was part of Malaysia's delegation to the UN conference on ending the Cambodian conflict and led the country's delegation during the formation of the International Criminal Court. He also was responsible for the safety of Malaysian nationals during the 1991 Malian coup d'état and played a role in securing the release of a fellow Malaysian ambassador who was held hostage in Peru.

== Background ==
Vengadesan was born on June 25, 1945, in Banting, Selangor, during the Japanese occupation of Malaya. He was the fourth child of S. Ramanathan Iyer and S. Gomathi Iyer, members of Malaysia's small Brahmin community.

In his infancy his family moved back to India following the trauma of Japanese rule, but encountered poverty there. They moved back to Malaya only to find the country embroiled in the Communist emergency.

He was educated at Victoria Institution and studied English at the University of Malaya where he was one of the pioneering batch of students.

== Diplomatic career ==
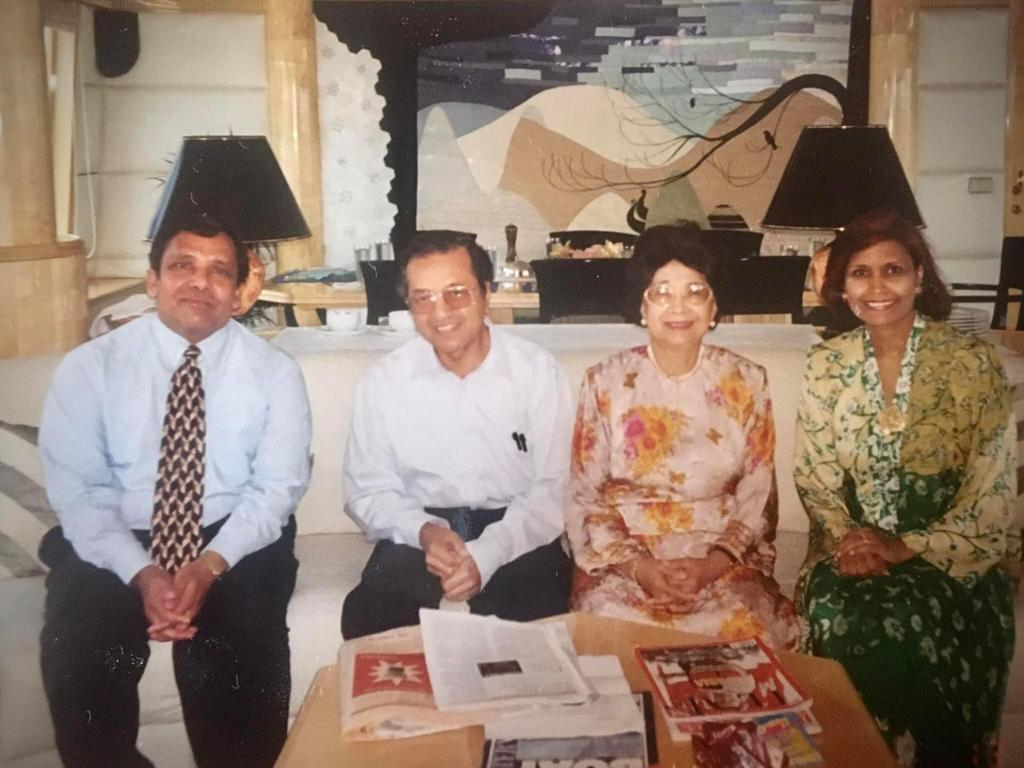
Ambassador Ramanathan Vengadesan and his wife Christie Gonzales with then prime minister of Malaysia Mahathir Mohamad and his wife Siti Hasmah Ali in 1993.

After a year in Telecoms, he joined the Foreign Ministry in 1969. He was awarded a citation for bravery by the Malaysian government for bringing aid to stricken areas after the deadly 13 May incident.

He was protocol officer during the first visit of a UK prime minister (Edward Heath) to Malaysia in 1971. Vengadesan served as a junior officer in the USSR (1972 to 1974), Japan (1974 to 1977) and Laos (1977 to 1979). He was also a delegate to the 1981 UN conference in New York to find a peaceful solution to the war in Cambodia that followed the fall of the Khmer Rouge. He was also deputy ambassador in Brussels (1983 to 1988) and Bangkok (1988 to 1990) before taking on his first ambassadorial role in Bamako, Mali.

Soon after taking over as ambassador to Mali, he faced down protestors who threatened to set fire to the ambassador's residence in March 1991. This is because the residence belonged to an associate of dictator Moussa Traore. Vengadesan responded by flying the Malaysian flag and calling on the Malian Foreign Ministry who provided soldiers to guard the residence during this period.

Vengadesan then shifted the West African base to Dakar, Senegal, becoming Malaysia's first resident ambassador there. In addition, he served in the Ministry as Undersecretary for the Americas from 1993 to 1997. During this time he was involved in behind the scenes negotiations for the release of Malaysia's ambassador to Peru Ahmad Mokhtar Selat, who was taken hostage by leftist guerillas.

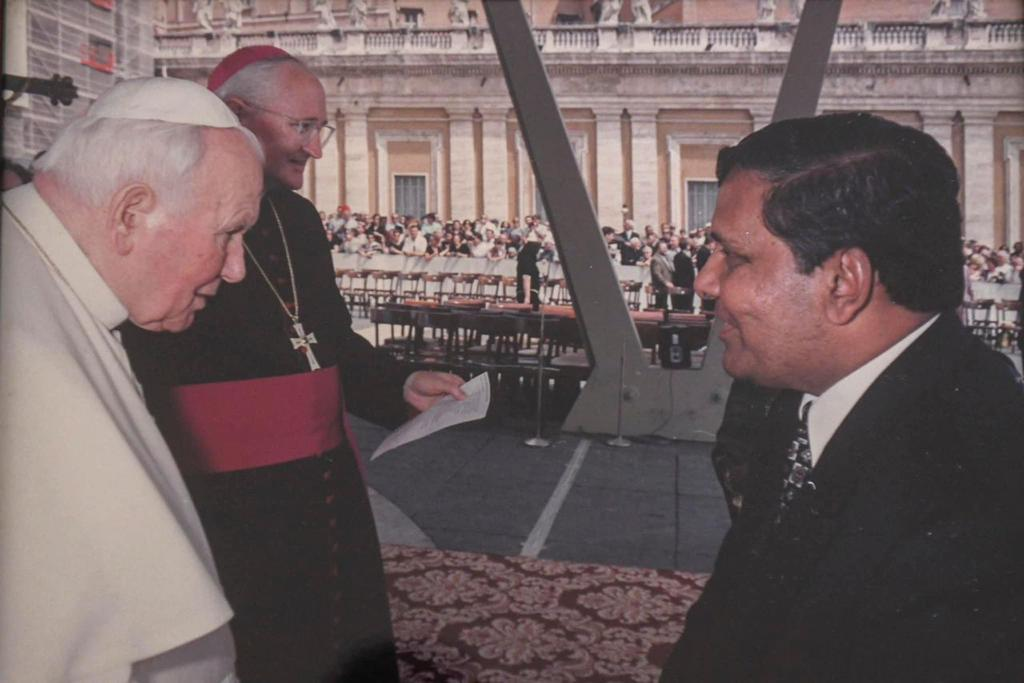
Malaysian ambassador to Italy Ramanathan Vengadesan meeting Pope John Paul II in 1997.

Vengadesan was Malaysia's Ambassador to Italy from 1997 to 2000, and led Malaysia's delegation to a United Nations diplomatic conference on the establishing an International Criminal Court. He also represented Malaysia at the twentieth anniversary of the International Fund for Agricultural Development which worked to promote the economic advancement of the rural poor through projects and programs.

He subsequently served as High Commissioner to Namibia from 2000 to 2004.

== Retirement ==
He was awarded the Kesatria Mangku Negara in 1986 and the Dato’ Sultan Salahuddin Abdul Aziz Shah (DSSA) in 1999, giving him the title of Datuk.

After his retirement from the Foreign Ministry, he was Governor for Malaysia to the Asia-Europe Foundation. Vengadesan was also elected vice-chairman of the Asia-Europe Foundation at its 26th Board of Governors meeting in Luang Prabang in 2010.

In October, 2026 he was featured as part of a generation of nation builders in the book Malaysian Indian Heroes: A Legacy That Inspires Generations written by Dr Jayaraman Munusamy.

== Family ==
Married to Datin Christie Gonzales, he is the brother-in-law of former Olympic field hockey player Datuk Arumugam Sabapathy, national sprint champion Freda Gonzales and academic Joseph Victor Gonzales. His older sister Santha was married to former Penang Free School headmaster G. Krishna Iyer, whose brothers included former Malaysian Airlines chairman Tan Sri G. Rama Iyer and former Malaysian Bar Council president Datuk Sulaiman Abdullah.

He is the father of three children, including former Star/Malaysiakini editor Martin Vengadesan, intellectual property lawyer Joanne Vengadesan, who is currently the chairperson-elect of the Multilaw global network of law firms and US Supreme Court translator Sharon Vengadesan Ruiz. He is also grandfather to six including writer Elesh Sebastian (Elesh Vengadesan-Lee), political science student Ekath Fidel and the late singer/songwriter I-Shan Esther of popular Malaysian band Faye Faire.

In June 2025, in conjunction with his 80th birthday, Vengadesan published his autobiography titled Triumphs & Tragedies: From Village Boy to Globe-trotting Ambassador.
