= Lee Lee Lan =

Malaysian ballet dancer and choreographer (1944–2022)

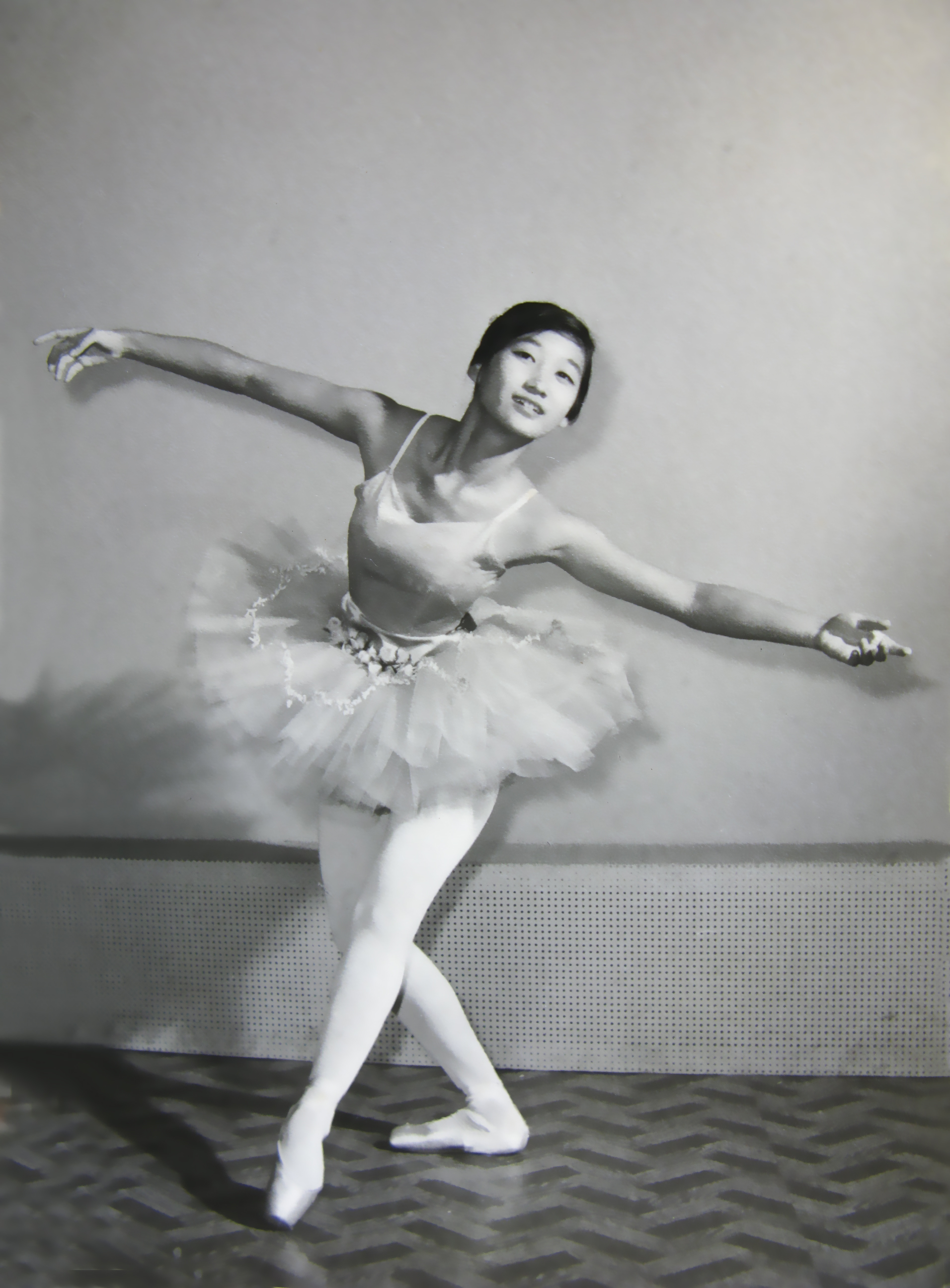
- Born: Tan Lee Lan; 16 September 1944; Brickfields, Kuala Lumpur, Malaysia
- Died: 16 May 2022 (aged 77); Malaysia
- Education: University of Malaya
- Employer(s): Federal Academy of Ballet; Kuala Lumpur Dance Theatre; Imperial Society of Teachers of Dancing
- Organization(s): Dance Society of Malaysia; Royal Academy of Dance; World Dance Alliance; International Council of Organizations of Folklore Festivals and Folk Arts
- Awards: Avon Woman of Distinction Award (1992) BOH Cameronian Lifetime Achievement Award (2008)

Lee Lee Lan (16 September 1944 – 16 May 2022), real name Tan Lee Lan, was a Malaysian ballet dancer and choreographer. She founded the Federal Academy of Ballet, Kuala Lumpur Dance Theatre and the Dance Society of Malaysia.

Lee was internationally known, and was appointed to the Imperial Society of Teachers of Dancing (ISTD), based in London, England, as their first Asian examiner for Ballet, Modern and Tap dance. In 1971, Lee passed the advanced executant exam of the Royal Academy of Dance in London, and was appointed an associate member. Lee served as vice president of the World Dance Alliance, was on the committee of the International Council of Organizations of Folklore Festivals and Folk Arts (CIOFF, partnered with UNESCO).

== Biography ==
Lee was born on 16 September 1944 in Brickfields in Kuala Lumpur, Malaysia. Her birth name was Tan Lee Lan and she was the fifth child of six children of Burmese and Chinese heritage.

Lee was introduced to ballet by two older sisters, and trained in classical ballet. She studied under instructors Soonee Goh, Blossom Shek and Ethel Foxcroft. Foxcroft offered Lee a full scholarship to her school in Kuala Lumpur after the family moved to Melaka in 1957. She travelled three hours by bus to attend her lessons.

Lee taught ballet part-time as a university student and graduated from the University of Malaya with a degree in Economics and History. As a student she also choreographed for musical productions including West Side Story, Flower Drum Song, Porgy and Bess and Show Boat.

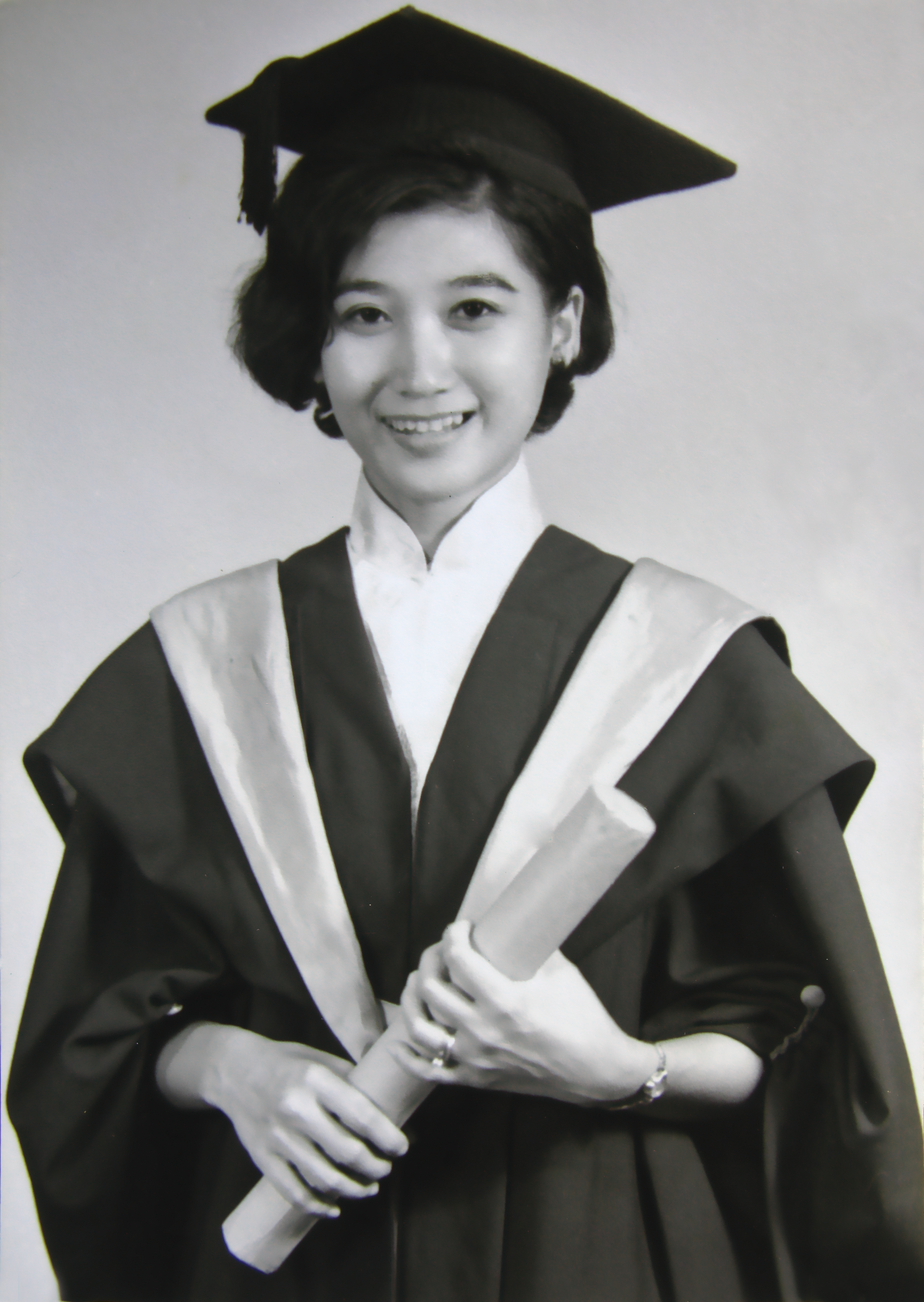
Graduating from the University of Malaya

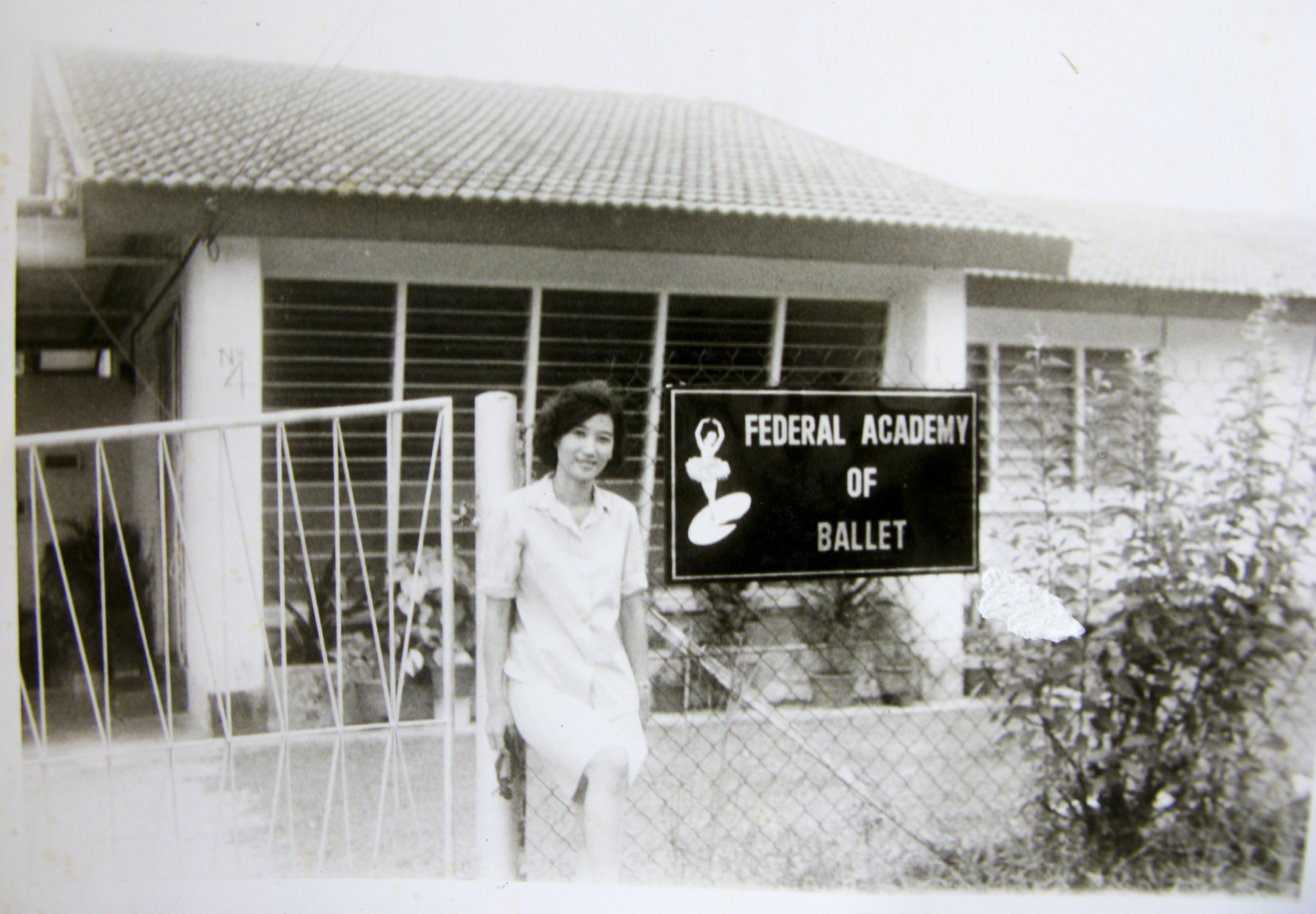
Lee outside the Federal Academy of Ballet

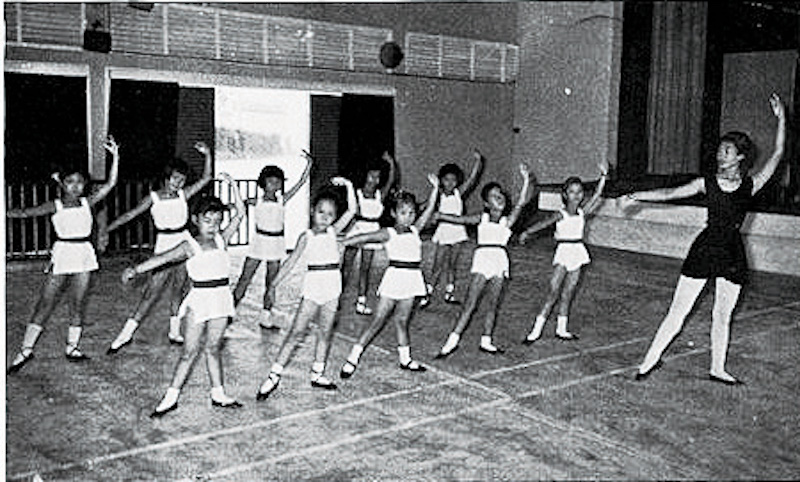
Lee teaching in 1967

In 1967, Lee founded the Federal Academy of Ballet (FAB) in Malaysia. Malaysian dancers and instructors who trained at FAB include Joseph Victor Gonzales, Vicknendran Siva Lingham, David Lee and Andrew Pan. The academy is the largest ballet school in Malaysia. Alongside teaching, Lee choreographed and danced for Malaysian TV, such as Antara Empat Kaum, Tarian-Tarian Malaysia, and Dayana.

In 1971, Lee completed the Royal Academy of Dance's seventh International Summer School, London that focused on "Early 20th centrury classical ballets". It was there she also performed in Ninette De Valois' Checkmate. Shortly after completing the summer school, Lee expanded her repertoire by completing jazz classes at the Convent Garden Dance Centre in London.

In 1981, Lee trained at the Martha Graham School of Contemporary Dance in New York, New York, United States. Her experience at the school inspired her to undertake further choreographic projects that established her as one of the pioneers of contemporary dance in Malaysia. Lee was known to have used a lot of traditional elements in costumes, music and movement. Lee created the three-act ballet Soraya, which premiered with accompaniment from the Malaysian Philharmonic Orchestra in 1981. The work included Malaysian cultural references, such as to ghost orang minyak, and incorporated traditional Malay dance forms, Chinese dances, and Indian dances. The following year, the piece was performed for Sultan Ahmad Shah of Pahang at the newly built Dewan Bandaraya Kuala Lumpur during a Red Crescent Society charity event.

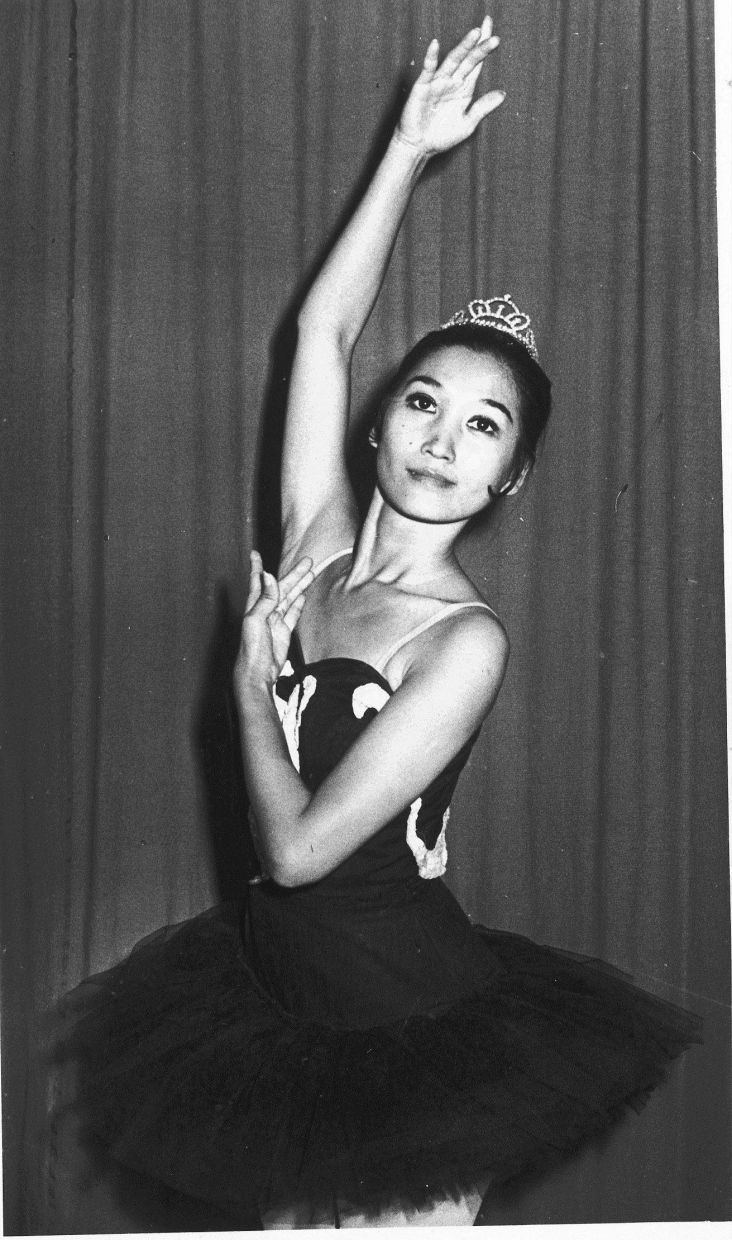
Lee performing

In 1984, Lee formed the Kuala Lumpur Dance Theatre (KLDT) with Tan Sri Lim Kok Wing. They took ten dancers to Las Vegas, Nevada, United States, to teach and perform traditional Malay dance in America. One notable performance choreographed by Lee was See Not, Hear Not, Speak Not, which won the 1984 Saitama Choreographic Competition in Tokyo, Japan.

In 1985, Lee established the idea of building a dance society in Malaysia with the aim to promote awareness of dance and raise the standard of dance in Malaysia. In 1986, Lee founded the Dance Society of Malaysia. The society has since organised competitions and workshops in Malaysia that focuses on raising the standard and awareness of dance in Malaysia.

In 1990, Lee became the Vice President of World Dance Alliance - Asia Pacific that spread information, research, workshops and performances among the local dance community. During this year, Lee also participated in the Malaysian Ministry of Culture's Bengkel Koreografi, an initiative for Malaysian choreographers to create a "Malaysian" dance form. Lee choreographed a 15 minutes dance drama, Kota Bharu 1941, that depicted village life and the Japanese invasion.

In 1992, Lee was awarded the Avon Woman of Distinction Award for her leadership and entrepreneurship, and the ISTD International Award.

In 1999, Lee choreographed Dance Classique, one of the works produced to launch the Istana Budaya national arts venue in Kuala Lumpur.

In 2008, Lee was honoured with the BOH Cameronian Lifetime Achievement Award.

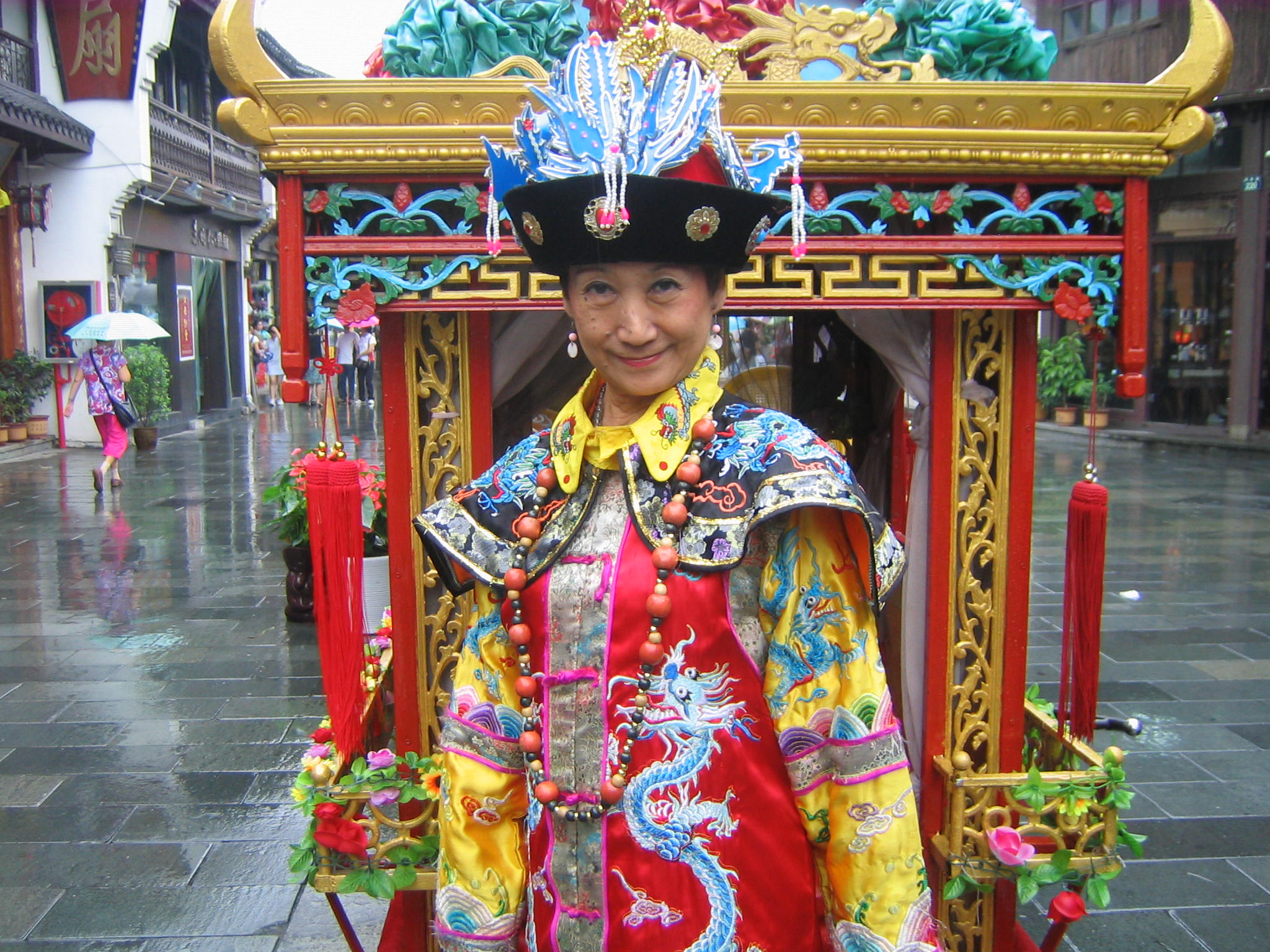
Lee during a dance tour

Lee died on 16 May 2022, aged 77, leaving behind her husband, and children Larry and Samantha Lee. Her son Larry Lee became Principal of the Federal Academy of Ballet (FAB) since her death.
