= Joe Gonzales =

Joe or Joseph Gonzales may refer to:

- Joe Gonzales (baseball) (1915–1996), Major League Baseball pitcher
- Joseph Gonzales (footballer) (1907–1984), French footballer
- Joseph Gonzales (boxer) (born 1941), French Olympic boxer
- Tee Joe Gonzales (Joseph Stonewall Gonzales, 1862–1940), American politician in East Baton Rouge, Louisiana
- Joseph Victor Gonzales (born 1960), Malaysian choreographer
- Joe Gonzales (attorney), American attorney and politician
- Joe Gonzales (wrestler) (born 1957), American Olympic wrestler
