= Sumazau =

Malaysian traditional dance

Sumazau dance
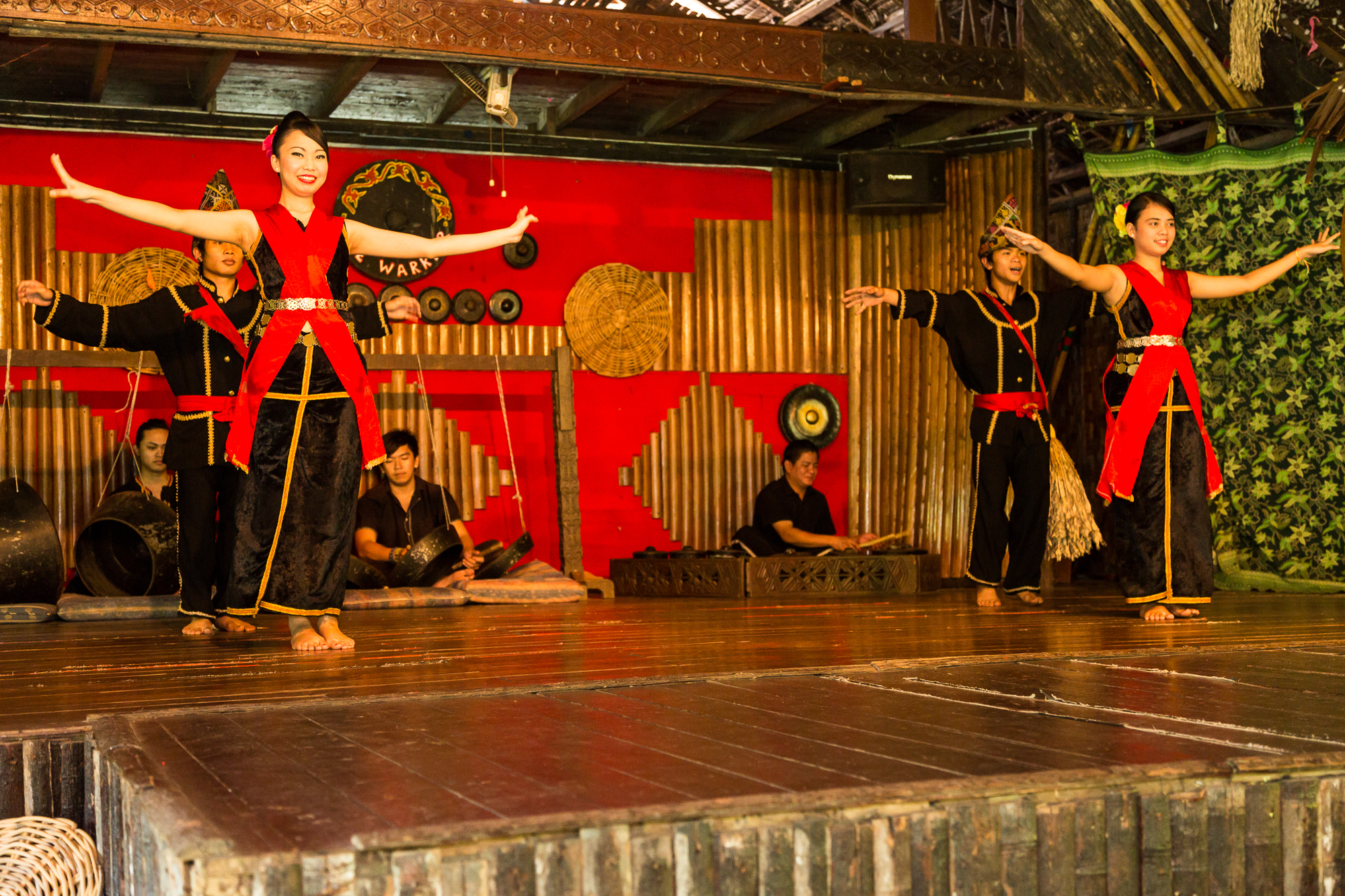
- Four dancers dancing the Sumazau in pairs accompanied by a traditional musical ensemble at the Monsopiad Heritage Village in Kuai Kandazon Village, Penampang District of Sabah.
- Native name: Sumazau
- Etymology: Sazau (dance) in the Kadazan language
- Genre: Traditional, folk
- Instrument(s): Gongs, drum, occasionally metallophone
- Inventor: Kadazan people
- Origin: Sabah, Malaysia

The Sumazau is a traditional dance performed by the Kadazan from Penampang and Papar districts, and by the Dusun (where it is known as sumayau) as well as the Murut (with alternate version) from adjacent areas in the western coast and interior of Sabah, Malaysia throughout the Kaamatan festival. The dance involves male and female pairs who are dressed in traditional clothing. The rhythm of the dance is set by the beat of hanging gongs. It is performed by raising both arms to shoulder height and flapping them.

Both the Malaysian federal and Sabah state governments have declared the dance, its music, and traditional clothing as a national heritage which includes the ritual processes and tools that are classified as the Kadazan tangible and intangible cultural heritage.

== Clothing ==
The clothing ensemble most associated with the sumazau is called the sinombiaka or baju sumazau in Malay language, which refers to traditional clothing made out of black cloth and gold braid. For women, it is accessorised with the tangkong (three rows of small brass rings attached to rattan) and himpogot, a belt of British trade dollar coins that were issued from 1895 to 1937. Men wear sigar, a colourful headcloth woven by the Iranun people which is obtained via trade with the Sama-Bajau and named podong/tanjak by the latter.

== Movements ==
The sumazau begins with the first movement where dancers shift their weight from foot to foot while keeping their knees bent and arms swinging on their sides in time to the music. When a male dancer cues the other dancers, they switch to another position where the arms are outstretched and their feet are on tiptoes. Men move their arms in a gentle rolling motion while women motion their arms with their elbows bent downwards and raise their heels slightly. This move imitates the departure of a bird, specifically an eagle, which would have been visible from paddy fields.

== Music ==
The term sumazau can also refer to the music associated with the dance, known in Malay as rentak sumazau (sumazau rhythm). Otherwise, it is also called magagong (to hit a gong), the nominalised form pagagungan or magagong sumazau.

=== Instruments ===
The dance is usually accompanied by a sompogogungan, a set of six to seven hanging gongs, and a gandang. The sumazau ensemble may include a kulintangan.

==== Sompogogungan ====
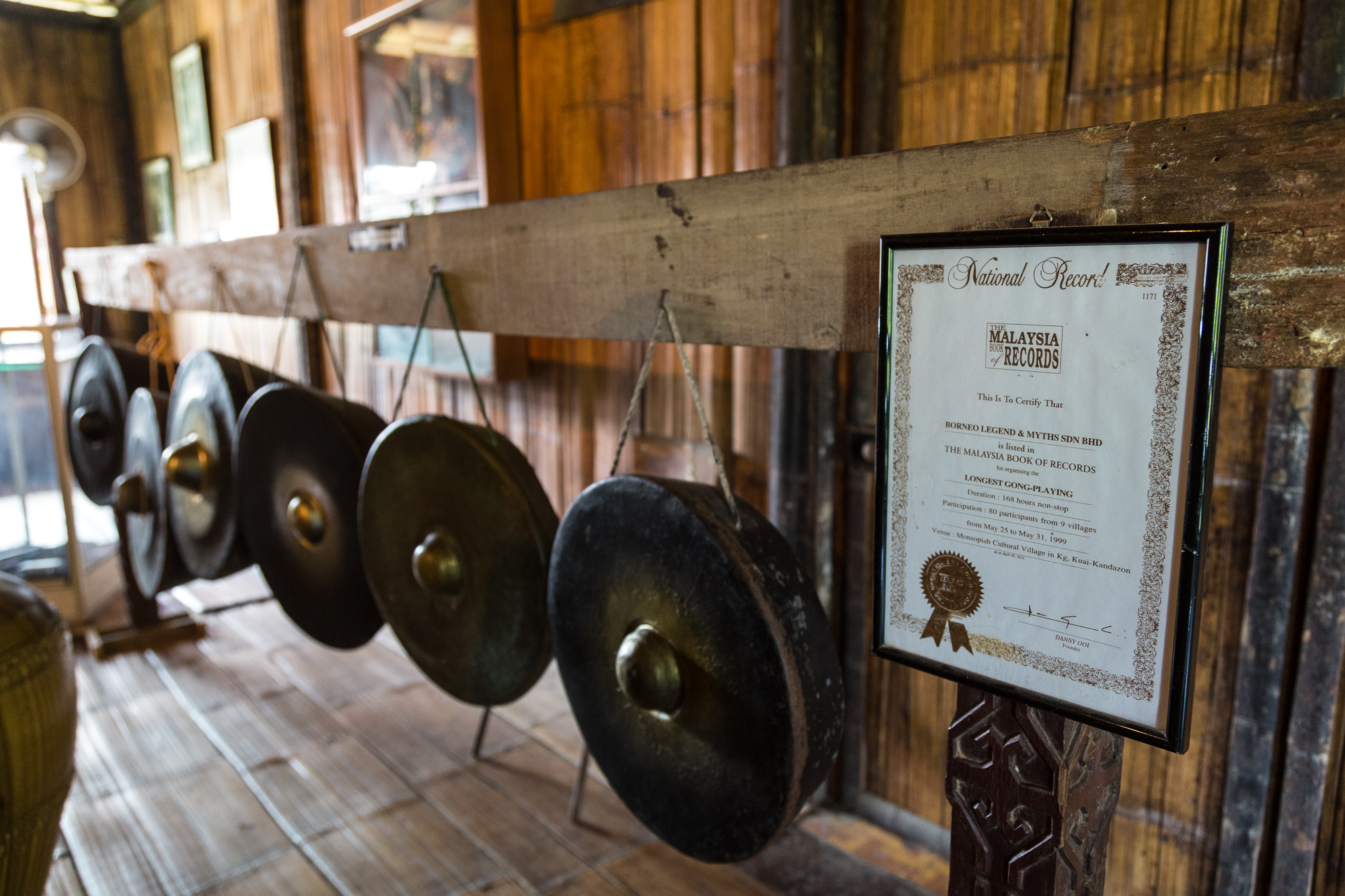
Sompogogungan that was used during a seven-day magang ceremony

In Gunsing (also spelled Guunsing) village of Penampang District, the gongs are named as such, left to right from the players' viewpoint:

- Sanang (canang in Malay)
  1. Sasalakan
  2. Naanangong
  3. Hahambatan
- Other
  1. Hotungong
  2. Tontoongan
  3. Tatavag

Each gong name denotes the musical part that it plays.

The gongs are classified into two types. Sanang gongs are small with thick brass walls, a single knob on a flat surface and a rim bent downwards. On the other hand, the remaining three gongs (called tawag among interior Sabah Kadazan-Dusuns) are heavy, made of brass or bronze, have deep rims, and the front surface is raised near the centre with larger knobs.

==== Gandang ====
The gandang is a drum carved from a single piece of wood, with two heads made from either cowhide or goatskin. The heads are bound with cane hoops. Into the hoops, wooden tuning pegs are inserted.

==== Kulintangan ====
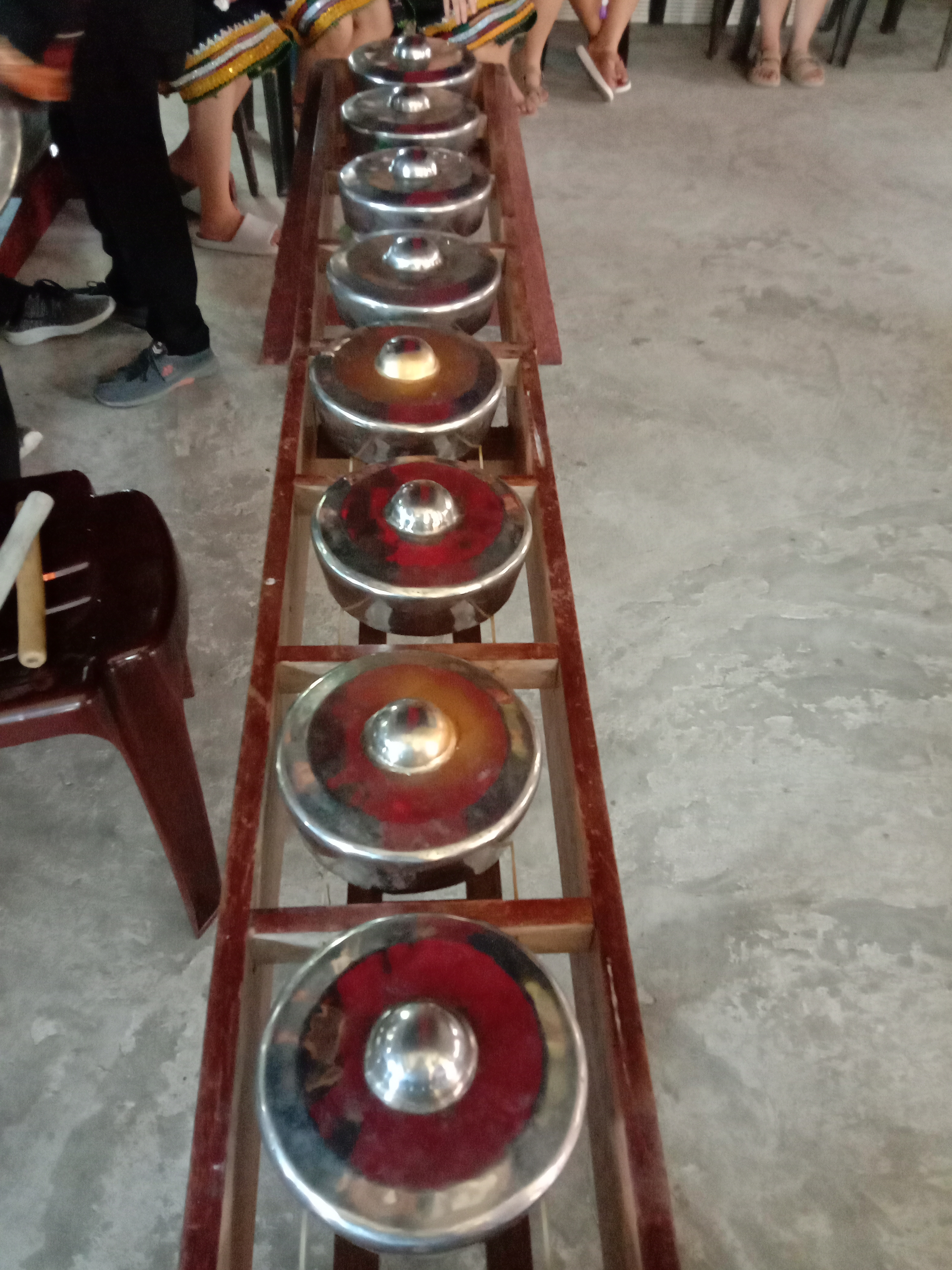
A true kulintangan (as opposed to a metallophone set)

Kulintangan in the context of sumazau music may refer to a gong-chime of eight or nine small knobbed gongs or a small metallophone of nine keys (named as such since its tuning and music follows that of the former). One is more likely to find the metallophone in a sumazau ensemble.

=== Instrument positions ===
From the instrument players' viewpoint, the gandang is placed left of the sompogogungan while the kulintangan is placed in front of the sompogogungan, sometimes with the player's back facing the audience.

=== Playing the instruments ===
Sumazau music consists of a rhythmic pattern of interlocking parts. This starts with the gandang, followed by the sompogogungan, beginning with the sasalakan down to the tatavag. The kulintangan provides melodic ornamentation over the texture of the drum and gongs.

The sompogogungan is struck with sticks covered with beeswax or rubber while the kulintangan is hit with two wooden beaters. The gandang is placed in an approximately vertical position and hit on one head with a stick covered in beeswax or a hard piece of coconut frond stem.

No separate pieces exist for the music. Instead, the same rhythmic pattern is repeated continuously until the dance sequence ends.

== Functions ==
The sumazau plays both ceremonial and celebratory roles. The sumazau is performed at certain stages in traditional ritual such as the magang after headhunting and for spirits inhabiting a bangkavan (collection of skulls), and the moginum ceremony. It is also performed during Kaamatan in honour of the traditional rice spirit, besides wedding celebrations, the 40th night of a deceased person's passing and other major social gatherings.

== Related dances ==
Among the various Kadazan-Dusun sub-groups, there are dances similar to the sumazau such as magarang for the Liwan Dusun of Tambunan District, sumayau for the Lotud Dusun of Tuaran District, mongigol for the Tindal Dusun of Kota Belud District, mongigol sumundai for the Rungus of Kota Marudu District, and both mongigol and mangalai for the Tinagas Dusun of Ranau, Telupid, Beluran, and Kota Marudu districts. Sumazau is sometimes also used to refer to the sazau dance of the Kadazan in Papar District.

== In the 21st century ==
=== Dancers clothing modification to suits particular religious standards ===
Since there are Kadazan-Dusuns who have converted to Islam, the sumazau clothing for Muslim females has been modified to suits in accordance with Islamic standards of modesty.

=== Mainstream society ===
During the visit by delegates of 23rd Conference of Speakers and Presiding officers of Commonwealth (CSPOC), sumazau was performed by the Sabah Cultural Board performers during the welcoming reception with some of the guests dance together.

During the COVID-19 pandemic, a video depicting a medical assistant officer, Norbert Andilah dancing the sumazau in a personal protective equipment (PPE suit) in an effort to combat boredom and depression among quarantined patients via SOP-compliant exercise sessions went viral.

In September 2023, during the royal visit of the 16th Queen consort of Malaysia, Tunku Azizah Aminah Maimunah Iskandariah as part of the "Kembara Kenali Borneo" to Ranau District, the Queen dance sumazau together with Kundasang locals.

=== International performances ===
In 2019, the Royal Commonwealth Society under the patron of Queen Elizabeth II invited dancers from the "Sabahan Abroad UK" to perform Sabahan traditional dances of sumazau as well as daling-daling and magunatip at the Westminster Abbey in London for Commonwealth Family Day.
