= Martin Vengadesan =

Malaysian author

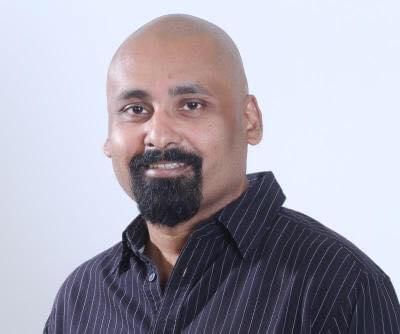
- Vengadesan in 2016
- Born: Martin Prasad Vengadesan; May 3, 1973 (age 53); Helsinki, Finland
- Education: Virginia Tech
- Occupations: Journalist, Author, Musician
- Years active: 1996–present
- Notable work: Malaysian Murders and Mysteries (2019) Malaya 2057: A Thousand Moons Have Passed (2021); 101 Albums You Need To Hear Before I Die (2023) 101 More Albums Before Time Runs Out (2026)
- Children: Elesh Vengadesan-Lee, Ekath Fidel Lee Vengadesan, I-Shan Esther Christie Vengadesan
- Parent(s): Ramanathan Vengadesan, Christie Gonzales

Martin Prasad Vengadesan (born 3 May 1973) is a Malaysian writer, musician and former editor.

He was news editor at The Star and associate editor at news portal Malaysiakini.

He then moved to the Malaysian Communications and Multimedia Commission, simultaneously taking up a strategic communications role with Communications Minister Fahmi Fadzil.

He has written four books and recorded five albums. He was also a trade union leader and a founding member of Malaysia’s ruling party Parti Keadilan Rakyat.

== Early life and education ==
Vengadesan was born in Helsinki, Finland in 1973, the son of former diplomat Ambassador Dato’ Ramanathan Vengadesan and his wife Datin Christie Gonzales. He grew up in nine countries across four continents including the USSR, Japan, Laos, Belgium, Thailand, Mali, Senegal and the USA.

He is the oldest of three siblings. His younger sisters include UK-based intellectual property lawyer Joanne Vengadesan, who is currently the chairperson-elect of the Multilaw global network of law firms, and US Supreme Court translator Sharon Vengadesan Ruiz.

He attended Sekolah Kebangsaan Sri Petaling, the British School of Brussels and the International School Bangkok. He then went to university at Virginia Tech, where he studied engineering and philosophy.

He returned to Malaysia to become an activist, journalist, musician and author.

== Career ==
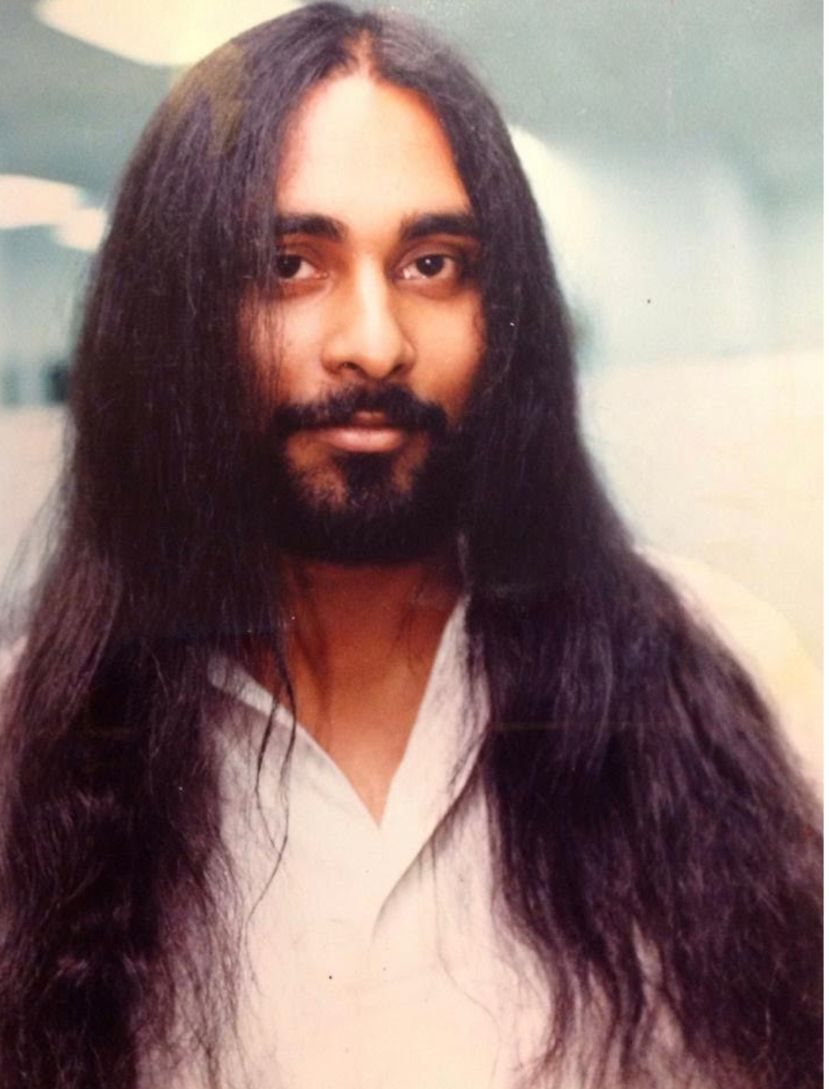
Vengadesan as a young Star journalist in 1996

The Star

Upon returning to Malaysia, he joined The Star in 1996 as a music journalist.

He worked at The Star from 1996 to 2018 and specialised in historical and research-based articles on music and politics. He also spent many years in the digital section as editor of The Star’s iPad app and news website, The Star Online. He wrote two columns for The Star, ‘Music Myths & Legends’ (2002–2012) and ‘Watching The World’ (2013–2018), which touched on music history and world politics respectively.

For two years, from 2005 to 2007, he was also a contributing editor and admin of popular music website Progarchives.com.

As a journalist and editor he was involved in highlighting police brutality and custodial deaths, press freedom suppression, workers' rights, Orang Asli issues, decriminalising medical marijuana, euthanasia and opposing the death penalty.

Throughout his career, he also wrote against the race-based political parties that dominated Malaysia, and called for needs-based affirmative action and an end to the first-past-the-post political system. He also argued that Malaysia's race and religion-based political parties and segregated school systems were fostering new levels of division and racial divides.

He was editor of Star i-Pad as it won a gold medal in tablet publishing at the Asian Digital Media Awards 2011, which was awarded by the World Association of Newspapers and News Publishers (WAN-IFRA).

Vengadesan also helmed the Star Online as news editor when it won bronze for best newspaper website at the Asian Digital Media awards in 2013.

In 2018, he represented Malaysia at the World Editors Roundtable held in Brussels, Belgium and cautioned against the possible misuse of fake news legislation. He argued that the government of Najib Abdul Razak in Malaysia has passed the law to help clamp down on exposure of the 1MDB corruption scandal.

Ten days after the fall of the Najib Razak-led government, Vengadesan spoke to investigative journalist Clare Rewcastle Brown, in an exclusive interview where she spoke about her struggles to expose the 1MDB scandal (for which the former prime minister was later jailed).

Malaysiakini

He left the Star for Malaysiakini at the end of 2018. He served as associate editor for Malaysiakini from 2019 to 2024.

He also wrote about human rights, press freedom and conservation violations in the region, particularly in Myanmar, East Timor, West Papua and Sri Lanka.He also interviewed US Secretary of State Mike Pompeo about regional political strategies.

In 2022, his multimedia story about the role of police brutality in custodial deaths called Death Behind Bars bagged a silver medal in the Excellence in Multimedia Journalism category at the Malaysian Press Institute awards.In 2023, he won the Best Columnist/Feature Writing Editor's category at the Malaysian Press Institute awards.

Communications Ministry

In December 2024, he joined the MCMC, simultaneously taking up an advisory role in the Communications Ministry. In this capacity he published opinion pieces supporting the Anwar Ibrahim government’s positions and reforms.

== Activism ==
Vengadesan was a trade union official from 1998 to 2008, eventually becoming general treasurer of the National Union of Journalists, Malaysia.

A socialist, he joined Parti Rakyat Malaysia in 1995, and was general secretary of its youth wing at the time of its merger with Parti Keadilan Nasional, during which he helped to write the new party's constitution. He specifically penned a clause calling for the replacement of race-based affirmative action with needs-based benefits.

He was briefly a vice-president of the youth wing of the new entity Parti Keadilan Rakyat from 2003 to 2004.

A student of left-wing history, he met and interviewed figures of the Communist Party of Malaya such as secretary-general Chin Peng, chairperson Abdullah CD and women's leader Shamsiah Fakeh.

He also interviewed veteran leaders of the Parti Sosialis Rakyat Malaysia like Kassim Ahmad, Syed Husin Ali and Abdul Razak Ahmad, as well as Socialist Party of Malaysia leaders Mohd Nasir Hashim, Dr Michael Jeyakumar Devaraj and S. Arutchelvan.

Conversely he has also interviewed former Inspector General of Police Tun Hanif Omar, former Armed Forces chief General Zulkifli Mohd Zin and former Malbatt head Brigadier General Abdul Latif Ahmad.

From 1998 until 2020, he was also a participant in the Reformasi, Bersih and Lawan street rallies and protests.

== Author ==
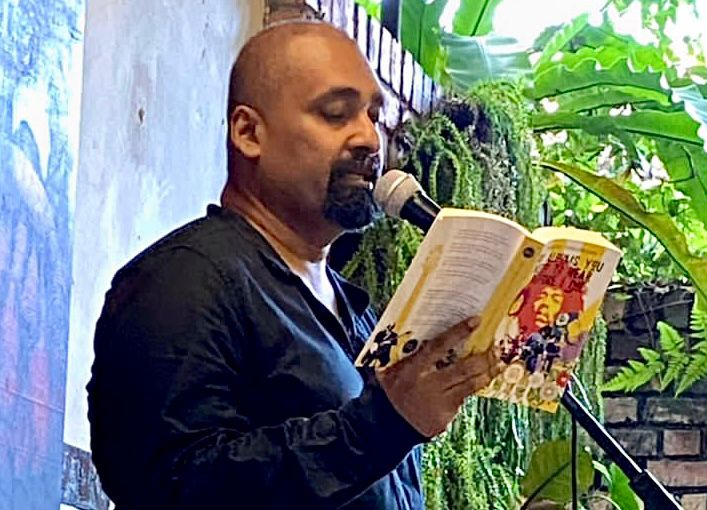
Vengadesan shortly after publishing his third book in 2023

He co-authored the best-selling true crime book Malaysian Murders & Mysteries with fellow journalist Andrew Sagayam which was published in November, 2019. Featuring stories on 42 of Malaysia’s most famous crimes, he interviewed the country’s top criminal lawyer Karpal Singh, leading historian Khoo Kay Kim and pioneer psychiatrist Dr Mahadevan Mahalingam. The book topped non-fiction sales charts and went on to enjoy six print runs.

Vengadesan’s second book was the absurdist dystopian science fiction novel Malaya 2057: A Thousand Moons Have Passed which he published in December, 2021. A departure from his non-fiction literary works, it was an allegorical tale articulating his socialist, secular humanist view of the world.

He published his third book 101 Albums You Need To Hear Before I Die in May, 2023. It draws on his career as a music journalist including interviews/anecdotes with B. B. King, Carlos Santana, Phil Collins, Ginger Baker, Cat Stevens and Ravi Shankar.

In September 2026, he published a sequel titled 101 More Albums Before Time Runs Out. It featured interviews with a range of performers such as Ken Hensley, Dave Grohl, Dave Mustaine, Steve Harris, Brett Anderson, Vince Clarke, Sammy Hagar and Steve Hackett.

He is a regular participant at literary events such as the KL Arts and Culture Festival and the George Town Literary Festival.

In 2025, his father R. Vengadesan published an autobiography titled Triumphs & Tragedies: From Village Boy to Globe-trotting Ambassador.

== Music ==
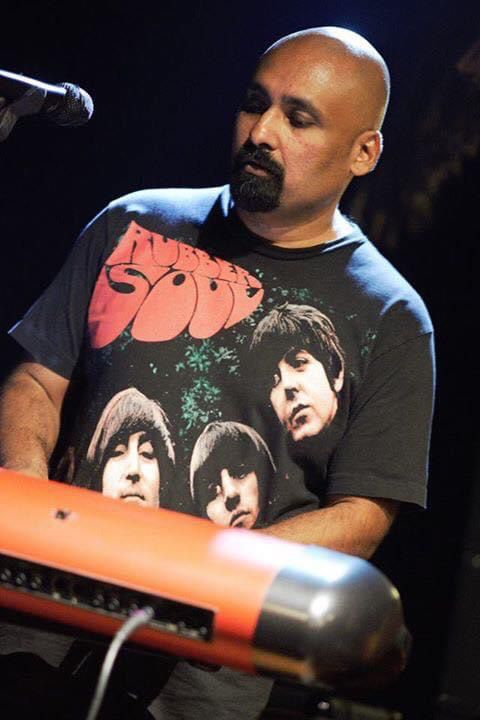
Vengadesan on keyboard

As a musician, Vengadesan released five albums in the folk-rock, psychedelic rock and progressive rock genres. Lyrically, the subject matter ranges from history to philosophy, religion to left-wing politics.

The first, entitled Spinning In Infinity, was with the group Samarkand with whom he performed at the large-scale rock festival Rock The World in March 2000. Its attendant single Thirty Pieces Of Silver was a top 10 hit on the Hitz FM charts in 2002.

The other four albums were with his recording project The Stalemate Factor.

Based on a chess theme, the albums are entitled The Queen’s Gambit (2018), The Bishop’s Sacrifice (2019), The Knight’s Flight (2020) and The Rook’s Siege (2023).

== Personal life ==
He has two sons, writer Elesh Sebastien, who publishes under the name Elesh Vengadesan-Lee (b.1997) and political science student Ekath Fidel (b.2003). His late daughter I-Shan Esther Christie (2005-2023) was a budding musician who died aged 18, on June 16, 2023.

Her band Faye Faire released a posthumous album, In My Mind on February 15, 2024, which contained five of her songs.

== Bibliography ==
- Malaysian Murders and Mysteries (with Andrew Sagayam) (2019) ISBN 9789814868556
- Malaya 2057: A Thousand Moons Have Passed (2021) ISBN 9789672438144
- 101 Albums You Need To Hear Before I Die (2023) ISBN 9789670042640
- 101 More Albums Before Time Runs Out (2026) ISBN 9786297693910

== Discography ==
- Samarkand - Spinning In Infinity (2002)
- Martin Vengadesan & The Stalemate Factor - The Queen’s Gambit (2018)
- Martin Vengadesan & The Stalemate Factor - The Bishop’s Sacrifice (2019)
- Martin Vengadesan & The Stalemate Factor - The Knight’s Flight (2020)
- Martin Vengadesan & The Stalemate Factor - The Rook’s Siege (2023)
