= Joseph Victor Gonzales =

Malaysian choreographer (born 1960)

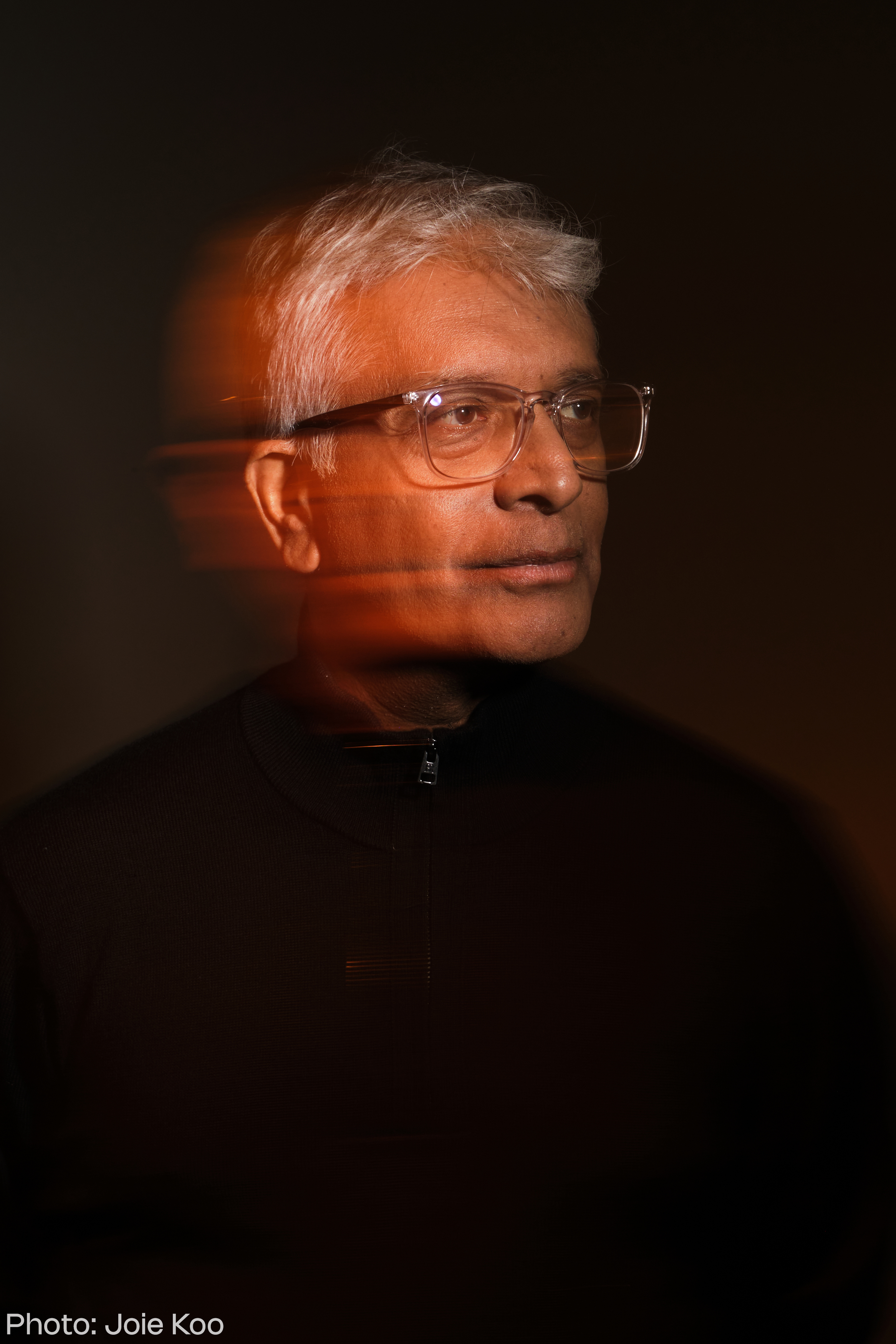
- Joseph Victor Gonzales in 2025
- Born: Joseph Victor Gonzales; 22 June 1960 (age 66); Kuala Lumpur, Malaysia
- Occupations: Dancer, choreographer, teacher

Joseph Victor Gonzales (born 22 June 1960) is a Malaysian dancer, choreographer, academic, arts administrator, author, and broadcaster. He is known for his contributions to the development of contemporary dance and dance education in Malaysia, particularly through his leadership of the Faculty of Dance at the National Academy of Arts, Culture and Heritage (ASWARA) and as founder and artistic director of ASK Dance Company. His work spans choreography, cultural policy, dance scholarship, arts management, and the preservation of Malaysian traditional dance forms.

Gonzales has combined training in ballet, modern dance, musical theatre, and Malaysian traditional dance with academic research on intercultural performance, dance pedagogy, and intangible cultural heritage. Over a career spanning more than four decades, he has served as a performer, choreographer, educator, university administrator, and international examiner, while publishing extensively on Malaysian dance and cultural identity.

== Early life and education ==
Joseph Victor Gonzales was born on 22 June 1960 in Kuala Lumpur, Malaysia. He initially studied mathematics at the University of Malaya, graduating with a Bachelor of Science degree in 1986. During his undergraduate years he became involved with KESUMA, the University of Malaya's cultural arts organization, where he studied traditional Malay dance under leading Malaysian dance scholars and practitioners including Mohd. Anis Md. Nor, Arif Ahmad, and Said Manap.

Gonzales subsequently pursued professional dance training in Malaysia and the United Kingdom. He studied ballet, modern jazz, contemporary dance, musical theatre, dance notation, anatomy, and dance history through institutions including the Federal Academy of Ballet, the London Studio Centre, the Bush Davies School, the Royal Academy of Dancing, and the Imperial Society of Teachers of Dancing. He earned professional teaching qualifications with distinction and later completed a Master of Arts in Professional Practice (Choreography) from Middlesex University in 2006.

His academic studies continued with a PhD from the University of Malaya in 2011. His doctoral research, Performing the Malaysian: A Study of Intercultural Contemporary Dance, examined questions of national identity, interculturalism, and contemporary performance in Malaysia. He later completed a Master of Buddhist Studies at the University of Hong Kong in 2022 and a Master of Cultural Studies at the Chinese University of Hong Kong in 2024, where his research focused on the preservation and transmission of Malaysian dance heritage.

== Career ==
=== Performance career ===
Gonzales began performing professionally during the 1980s with Kuala Lumpur Dance Theatre and other Malaysian dance organizations. His early work included performances in traditional Malaysian dance, contemporary dance, jazz dance, and ballet. Between 1991 and 1992 he performed as a principal dancer in the West End touring production of The King and I in the United Kingdom.

Joseph Gonzales performing on the stage

Throughout the 1990s and 2000s he appeared in numerous productions, festivals, and international collaborations in Malaysia, Europe, and Asia. His performance work included productions by Aida Redza, Suhaimi Magi, Judimar Hernandez, and other prominent Southeast Asian choreographers.

== Works ==
At ASWARA, Gonzales produced productions featuring traditional dances and multicultural identities, such as Main Zapin, Tapestry, Asyik, Jamu and Hang Li Po. He was also the artistic director of the international Tari series, a festival of international universities of the arts from 1998 to 2014.

Other productions included: P. Ramlee, Musical (2007) at the Palace of Culture (Istana Budaya) in Kuala Lumpur, Hamlet (2007), Passion and Tunku, the musical (2007) at the Kuala Lumpur Performing Arts Centre, Gong Illusions for Rhythms in Bronze (2011), [14] The Queue (2013), Take Off! (2013) at the Penang Centre for the Performing Arts, Enter/Exit (2014), Suara (2011), The Last Tea Party (2013) for ASWARA, Becoming King... The Pakyung Revisited (2014 and 2015), and Seru (2016). He produced and directed Tabula Rasa (2024), and Setanggi Tari Melayu (2025). He served as dramaturg for Never Stand Still (2026)

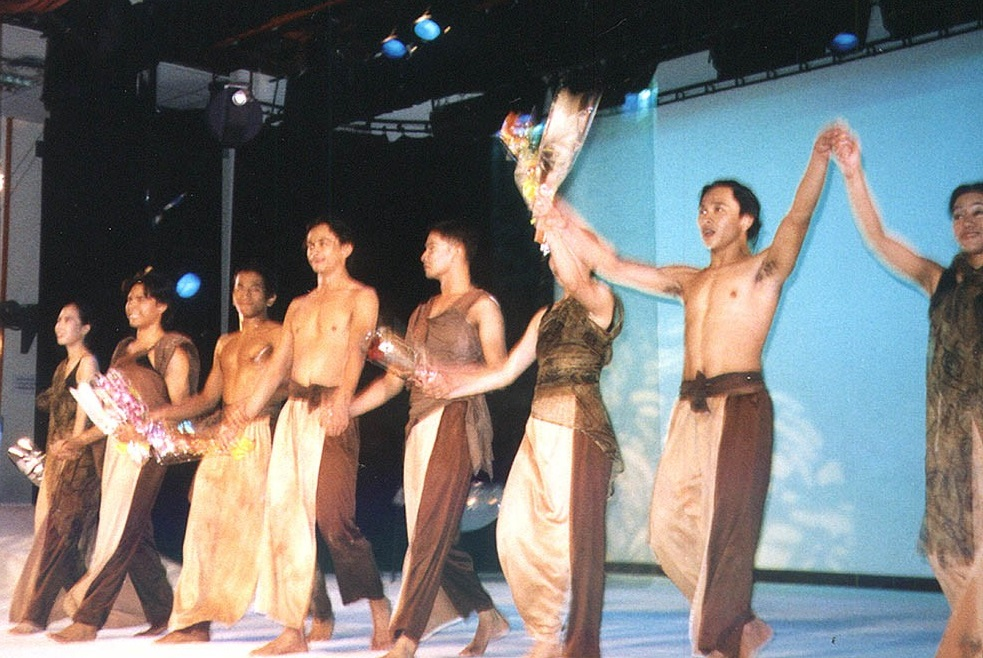
Participants of the choreographic composition "Awas" (2003), director by Gonzales

Unparalleled Ragas directed by Joseph Victor Gonzales

In 2011, he established ASK Dance Company, a professional dance company that presents performances in Malaysia and at international festivals. Notable productions include Women on Top and 3 Faces (2011), 2 by 2 (2024), Crossing Borders in Bharatanatyam (2017), Menempa Tari Tradisi (2022), Tabula Rasa (2024), Setanggi Tari Melayu (2025) and Never Stand Still (2026). The company's outreach projects Forging Tradition, teaching traditional Malaysian dance across the nation have reached approximately 37,000 school children and young adults. This has been supported by the Sime Darby Foundation, while the outreach production Menempa Tari Tradisi has received annual Yayasan Hasanah grants since 2022.

Terinai Mengadap performed by ASK Dance Company Photo Huneid Tyeb

=== Dance education and academic leadership ===
Gonzales has played a role in dance education in Malaysia, specifically pioneering multiculturalism at the tertiary level. From 1998 to 2015 he served as Dean of the Faculty of Dance at ASWARA, where he was responsible for curriculum development, academic administration, staff recruitment, and international partnerships. Under his leadership, ASWARA expanded its dance programmes from certificate level to postgraduate studies and became a major centre for dance training in Malaysia. In this time, the institution achieved many milestones including playing a vital role in reviving traditional Malay dances Terinai, Joget Gamelan, Tari Inai and Zapin through research and performances. Students of non-Chinese ethnicity emerged champions in the National Chinese Dance Competition in 2005, as well as the National Ballet Solo Competition. Graduates of non-Indian ethnicity also completed their Indian classical dance Bharatanatyam solo debuts, the Arangetram with the collaboration of The Temple of Fine Arts beginning in 2011. In that year, founded ASK Dance Company, a dance company devoted to performance, education, and community engagement.

Between 2016 and 2024 Gonzales served as Professor, Head of Academic and Contextual Studies, and Programme Leader for the Master of Fine Arts (Dance) programme at the Hong Kong Academy for Performing Arts. He also served on institutional research, curriculum, and postgraduate committees.

== Broadcasting and media ==
Alongside his work in dance, Gonzales developed a parallel career in broadcasting. Beginning in the 1990s he worked as a television and radio presenter, hosting sports and current-affairs programming for Malaysian media outlets. He became associated with coverage of international sporting events including the FIFA World Cup, the English Premier League, the Commonwealth Games, and the Winter Olympics. He also served as a judge on dance-oriented reality television programmes.

== Scholarship and research ==
Gonzales's academic work has focused on Malaysian dance history, intercultural performance, dance education, cultural policy, and intangible cultural heritage. His research has examined the preservation of traditional dance forms, the development of contemporary dance in Malaysia, Bharatanatyam performance beyond ethnic boundaries, and the relationship between dance and national identity.

His publications have appeared in journals and edited volumes concerned with dance studies, arts education, cultural studies, and performance research. He has presented keynote lectures and conference papers internationally, including in Malaysia, Hong Kong, India, Thailand, Australia, New Zealand, South Korea, Indonesia, and the United States.

== Family ==
Gonzales is the brother of Datin Freda Sabapathy, former national sprinter and now advocate. His brothers-in-law include her husband former Olympic field hockey player Datuk Arumugam Sabapathy and the retired Malaysian ambassador to Italy, Dato’ Ramanathan Vengadesan. He is also the uncle of writer and journalist Martin Vengadesan.

== Awards ==
- "Cross-cultural Champion of the Arts" (Boh Cameronian Arts Awards, 2007)
- "Best Music & Sound Design" (Boh Cameronian Arts Awards, 2007)
- "Outstanding Contribution to the Development of Dance" (Academy Kshetra, 2010)
- "Outstanding Contribution to the Development of Dance" (Rotary Club, 2011)
- "Outstanding Service" (National Academy of Arts, Culture and Heritage, 2011)
- "Best Choreographer of the Year" (2015)
- "Game-changer of the Year" (Kakiseni, 2019)
- "Lifetime Achievement in the Arts" - Sugam Arts and Heritage Foundation, 2024.
- "Tokoh Seni KL" - Department of Culture and Arts 2025.
- Best Choreographer in a Full-length Production (2026) together with Mohd Fauzi Amiruddin, Zulkarnain Zuber, Imran Syafiq and Azmie Zanal Abdden.

== Selected publications ==
=== Books ===
- Koreografi Kontemporari Malaysia (2019)
- Malaysian Dancescapes (2015)
- Intercultural Contemporary Dance in Malaysia (2012)
- Dancing the Malaysian (2011)
- Sharing Identities: Celebrating Dance in Malaysia (2011)
- Dancing Mosaic: Issues On Dance Hybridity (2007)
- Choreography – A Malaysian Perspective (2004)

=== academic publications ===
- "The Pontianak in Contemporary Dance in Malaysia" (2026)
- "Blurring Boundaries of Race and Religion Through Bharatanatyam in Malaysia" (2023)
- "Menempa Tari Tradisi: Preservation and Transmission of Intangible Cultural Heritage of Malaysian Dances" (2023)
- "Empowering Artists – Renewing Society" (2022)
- "The Pivot Point: Teaching Dance Online" (2021, with Hennie Yip)
- "Makyung in Contemporary Malaysia: Strategies for Preservation and Proliferation" (2021)

== Selected choreographic works ==
- Setanggi Tari Melayu (2025)
- Becoming King ... the Pakyung Revisited (2014–2015)
- The Queue (2012)
- The Last Tea Party (2010)
- Huminodun (2008)
- Asyik (2007)
- Qadim (2007)
- AWAS! (1999)
