= Mak Inang =

- Native name: Tarian Mak Inang
- Origin: Malaysia

Mak Inang (Jawi: مق عناڠ) is a traditional Malay dance that originated from the time of Malacca Sultanate. The dance is accompanied by a unique music which is believed to have been composed by the order of Sultan Mahmud Shah of Malacca.

In the past, both song and dance were taught to the Inang of the palace ("singer dancers") for them to perform it during royal functions. The dance's movements and its music are so graceful and have all the qualities for court performances.

Mak Inang dance is also known as Si Kembang Cina, reflecting the existence of Chinese influence in its music. Nowadays, the dance is refined and called with its modern name "Inang", and usually performed in social functions like wedding receptions.
