= Dikir barat =

Musical form native to northeast Malay Peninsula

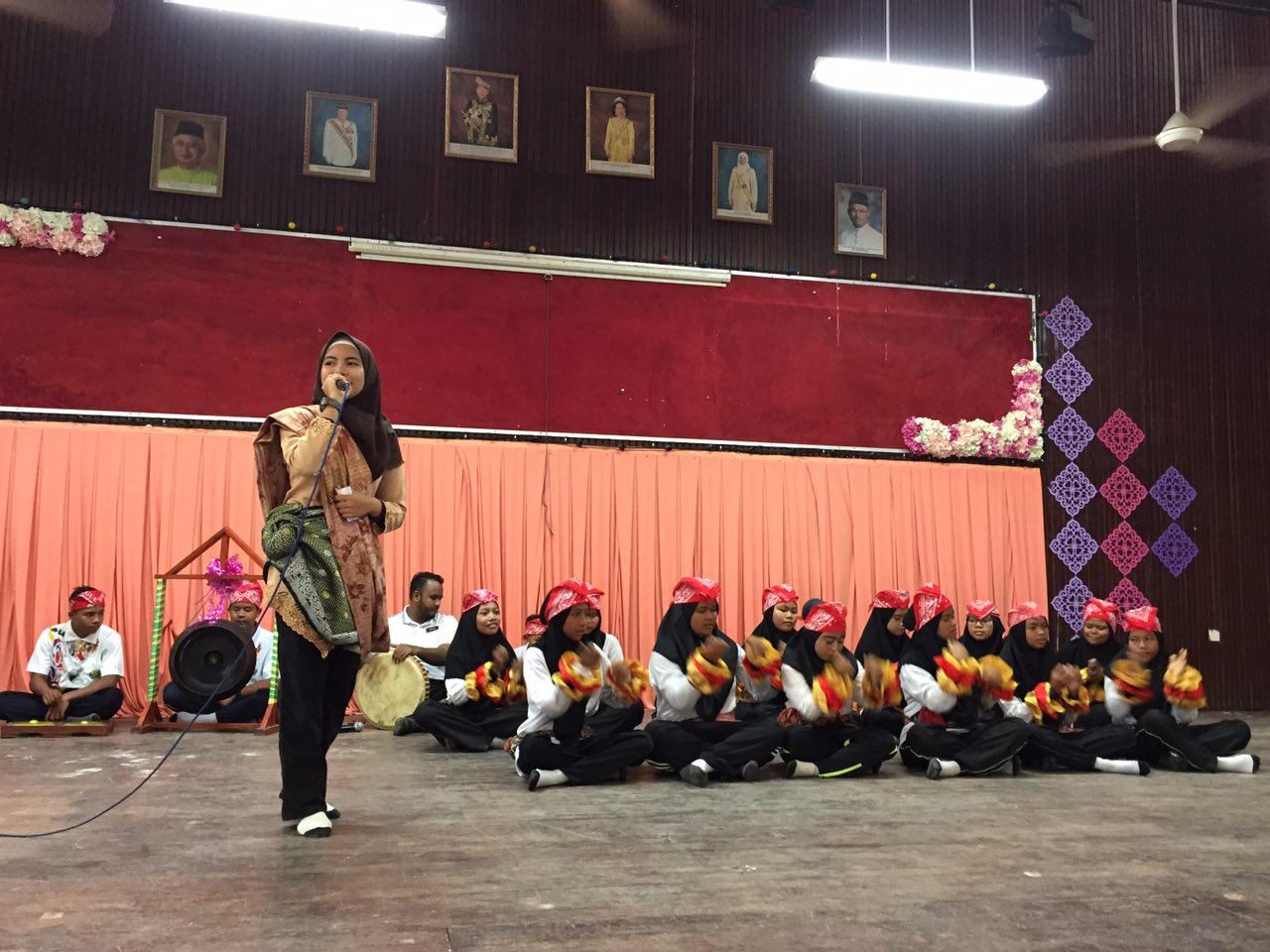
- Dikir Barat presentation by female students.
- Native name: دكير بارت; Dikir Hulu/ดิเกร์ฮูลู
- Genre: Traditional dance
- Origin: Thailand (Pattani, Yala and Narathiwat provinces) and Malaysia (Kelantan)

Dikir barat, (Note: Jawi: ديكير بارت, Kelantan-Pattani: diké barak; Thai: ลิเกบารัต; RTGS: like barat) dikir hulu (Note: ديكير هولو, local dialect: diké ulu) or lebe ulu is a musical form, native to the northeastern coastal region of Malay Peninsula, that involves singing in groups—often in a competitive setting. Dikir barat may be performed either with a percussion instrumental accompaniment, or with no instruments at all.

The art originated among the peasantry of Patani who would incant verses back and forth with each other (dikir, from Arabic: ذِكْر, romanized: dzikr) as a form of entertainment while harvesting their paddy fields; this would be later be developed to be performed in functions for guests from faraway lands (jamuan lebe ulu, 'banquet of inland/upstream imams') hence the art would be known as lebe ulu. It was only the spread to Kelantan in the 1930s where it is given the popular name dikir barat– barat ('west') referring to the location in relation to Kelantan.

It is still performed in both modern nation-states of Malaysia and Thailand, the former's National Department for Culture and Arts actively promotes it as an important part of Malaysian national culture. Since the mid-1970s, the art form has also gained popularity among the Malays of Singapore, who have adapted it into a distinctive style known as Dikir Barat Singapura, also referred to as Dikir Singapura.

== Description ==
Dikir barat is typically performed by groups of ten to fifteen members, though there is no actual set size, even in competitive environments. A group usually sits cross-legged on a platform, sometimes surrounded by the audience. Where the dikir barat is performed competitively, the two competing groups will both be on the stage at the same time.

In a typical dikir barat performance, the group will perform two segments. The first is led by the tok juara ('master trainer'), who is often the person in charge of the musical training of the group. This first segment usually contains the more complex musical arrangements, and will likely feature the awak-awak (lit. 'crew', chorus) singing in unison with the tok juara, as well as responsorial segments of singing, similar to what the tukang karut ('weaving master') does with the awak-awak, later in the performance. Though musically more complex than what will follow, the first segment is seen as the "low-key" segment of the performance.

The creative leader of a dikir barat group is the tukang karut. The tukang karut (who is often himself a former tok juara) is expected in his performance to utilise current social and political issues which will be relevant to the audience. His ability to do this helps to uphold the reputation of the dikir barat group. Leading the awok-awok during the second and concluding segment of the performance, the tukang karut sings pantuns—most of which are likely original and improvised on the occasion of the performance, but some which may be known to the audience. (Pantuns are an oral poetry form indigenous to the Malay region, and are not exclusive to the dikir barat.) That the dikir barat uses pantuns does not mean that it is a performance of poetry. Like any poet, the tukang karut is expected to create lyrics that touch upon everyday life, but he can also address social issues, legal matters, politics, government regulations, and human foibles. The tone can be satirical, sarcastic, or simply humorous, but above all it is expected that it be clever. The tukang karut makes up and sings lyrics on the topic of the performance (which may be pre-established or simply the choice of the tukang karut), and the awok-awok sings the same lyrics back to him. During the performance, members of the awok-awok clap and perform rhythmic body movements, which bring energy to the performance.

Historically, dikir barat performances have been all-male. However, in recent years, especially with groups based in urban areas, female performers are beginning to appear.

While most musical instruments are excluded from dikir barat, some groups employ percussion instruments, including the rebana, maracas, or a shallow gong.

== Competition ==
In a competitive performance, the two opposing dikir barat groups both sit on the stage platform at the same time. The performance is as musical as a non-competitive performance, but the competitive dikir barat is also, according to one observer, “a duel of wits”. The tukang karut from one group will throw out a topic or question, singing it to the awok-awok, who will sing it back to him. At this time the opposing dikir barat group's tukang karut must reply with an answer more clever than the original question, and after the second awok-awok sings it back, the first tukang karut must take the dialogue another step higher. Essentially, what transpires is a type of lyrical debate, but instead of scoring technical debate points, tukang karuts who regularly produce well-created retorts will win audience laughter, affection, and admiration.

Originally, dikir barat was limited to competition between neighbouring villages, but in the 20th century, as its popularity began to spread (aided by the ability to record performances), it became a national phenomenon. Today, dikir barat competitions have become wildly popular across Malaysia, and each year there are national champions crowned, not only for the dikir barat groups as a whole, but there also are national champion in the categories of tukang karuts and tok juara. Top tukang karuts are famous and popular, much like rock stars in the West.

The government of Malaysia now officially sponsors dikir barat as a major element of national culture, and has experienced substantial success in spreading its popularity. To facilitate its spread, in 2006, then-Minister of Information Datuk Seri Zainuddin Maidin said he would encourage the development of English language dikir barat, as English is the most widely spoken second-language in the former British colony, and could thus be shared by more citizens. The national competitions in Malaysia have been broadcast on radio since 1993, and on television since 2006.

== Spread of dikir barat ==
=== Origins ===
Sources are divided on whether dikir barat originated in southern Thailand or the Malaysian state of Kelantan, which borders Thailand, or even from a wedding dance shared by both the Thai Malays and the Kelantanese Malay.

Today, dikir barat has spread to the end of the Malay Peninsula, having reached Singapore, by some accounts, in the mid-1980s, where it is also being promoted by at least one government agency.

=== Dikir barat in the West ===
In recent years, Dikir barat performances have spread to the West, most commonly on university campuses.

- In 2007, a Malaysian student organisation at Penn State University, in the United States, included a dikir barat performance as part of a traditional Malaysian wedding being held on campus.
- The Malaysian Student Organisation of the University of Illinois also performed a dikir barat for the Malaysian Cultural Exhibition organised at the university.
- The Malaysian Society of Imperial College London, performs a dikir barat annually on its Malaysian Night organised by the university.
- The Malaysian Students Association (MSA) of The University of Warwick performs this art form on its Malaysian Night (MNight) every year.
- The Malaysian Students' Organisation of the Australian National University performs this performance on its Malaysian Night 2014 with Malaysian Student Council of Australia, Australian Capital Territory (ACT Chapter) and Kelab UMNO ACT.

== In popular culture ==
- One of the TV advertisements for the then upcoming Malaysian Idol had the instance of a battle of hawking trades in a pasar malam between a mango seller and an orange seller, where the former raps about his mangoes in English and the latter flaunts off his oranges in a singing manner similar to that of dikir barat.
- In the Malaysian video game No Straight Roads (released in 2020), one of the bosses is named "DK West", a pun on the name of Dikir Barat, and the music played during the fight is described as a rap battle between the main characters and DK West which plays with a crowd of faceless individuals sitting near DK West and clapping in rhythm. To add to the music, the game also makes use during this segment of Wayang Kulit.
