= G. Rama Iyer =

Malaysian civil servant (1932–2020)

Tan Sri G.K. Rama Iyer (Tamil: ஜி. ராமா ஐயர்) (13 March 1932 – 17 March 2020) was a Malaysian civil servant, who served as Secretary-General of the Primary Industries Ministry and chairman of Malaysia Airlines. He was known for his role in establishing civil service protocols in the years following independence.

He was born in 1932 in Penang. His father was V.K. Ganapathy Iyer, a teacher at Penang Free School. Rama himself was educated in Penang Free School and joined the civil service in 1955 at a time when Malaya was approaching independence.

As a civil servant, he served as secretary-general of three ministries: Planning and Socio-Economic Research; Works and Public Utilities; and Primary Industries.

Rama Iyer also established the Malaysian International Shipping Corporation and later Malaysian Airline System (MAS) where he served as its first chairman for three years following the split of Malaysian-Singapore Airlines (MSA) in 1971.

Rama was the older brother to lawyer Sulaiman Abdullah. Another brother, G. Krishna Iyer, served as headmaster of Penang Free School from 1983 to 1988. A third brother is Australia-based doctor Dr Lakshmanasamy Iyer.

At the time of his death on March 17, 2020, Rama Iyer was survived by his wife Puan Sri Vijayalakshmi, daughters Lavanya and Soumya, and sons Srihari and Badhri.

== See also ==
- Ministry of Plantation Industries and Commodities (Malaysia)
