= Sulaiman Abdullah =

Malaysian lawyer (1946–2023)

Sulaiman Abdullah (6 July 1946 – 18 December 2023) was a Malaysian lawyer who acted in a number of the country's most famous trials and served as president of the Malaysian Bar Council.

== Life and career ==
Born G Srinivasan Iyer on 6 July 1946, he was the younger brother of former Malaysia Airlines chairperson G. Rama Iyer and ex-Penang Free School headmaster G. Krishna Iyer. He studied at the SK Wellesley, SK Francis Light and the Penang Free School, all in Penang. He graduated with a law degree from the University of Singapore in 1969 and started his practice the same year.

After marrying Mehrun Siraj and converting to Islam, he took the name Sulaiman Abdullah. Their son Huzir Sulaiman was born in 1973. He later became a prominent playwright.

Sulaiman Abdullah obtained a master's degree in law from University of London in 1979 and a diploma in Syariah Law and Practice from the International Islamic University Malaysia in 1992.

Sulaiman Abdullah was a Universiti Malaya law lecturer and served as both Malaysian Bar secretary (1993-1995) and president (2000-2001). In an interview with the Star in 2007 he said that as a lawyer, he was always interested in the way the nation is governed which was why he first stood for office in the Bar's executive committee shortly after the 1988 judicial crisis.

Sulaiman Abdullah was one of the lead prosecutors against former Prime Minister Najib Razak in the SRC International case. He was also lawyer for prime minister Anwar Ibrahim at the time of his corruption and sodomy trials, and Anwar called him a trusted friend beyond the courtroom.

Apart from that, he also represented Mohammad Nizar Jamaluddin who challenged the legitimacy of Zambry Abdul Kadir's's appointment as Perak Mentri Besar in the Perak constitutional crisis case in 2009. Sulaiman served as counsel to Federal and State Islamic agencies in a number of high-profile cases, including the Lina Joy conversion case, and the Catholic Church's challenge to the "Allah” ban.

In later cases, Sulaiman was lawyer to Kalsom Ismail, widow of former Malaysian Ambassador to the United States Jamaluddin Jarjis, in her family matrimonial asset or faraid dispute at the Syariah court. He also represented controversial Islamic preacher Zakir Naik in his defamation cases against DAP leaders M Kulasegaran and P Ramasamy.

Sulaiman Abdullah died on 18 December 2023, at the age of 77. His wife Mehrun predeceased him on 29 June 2021.
