= Multilaw =

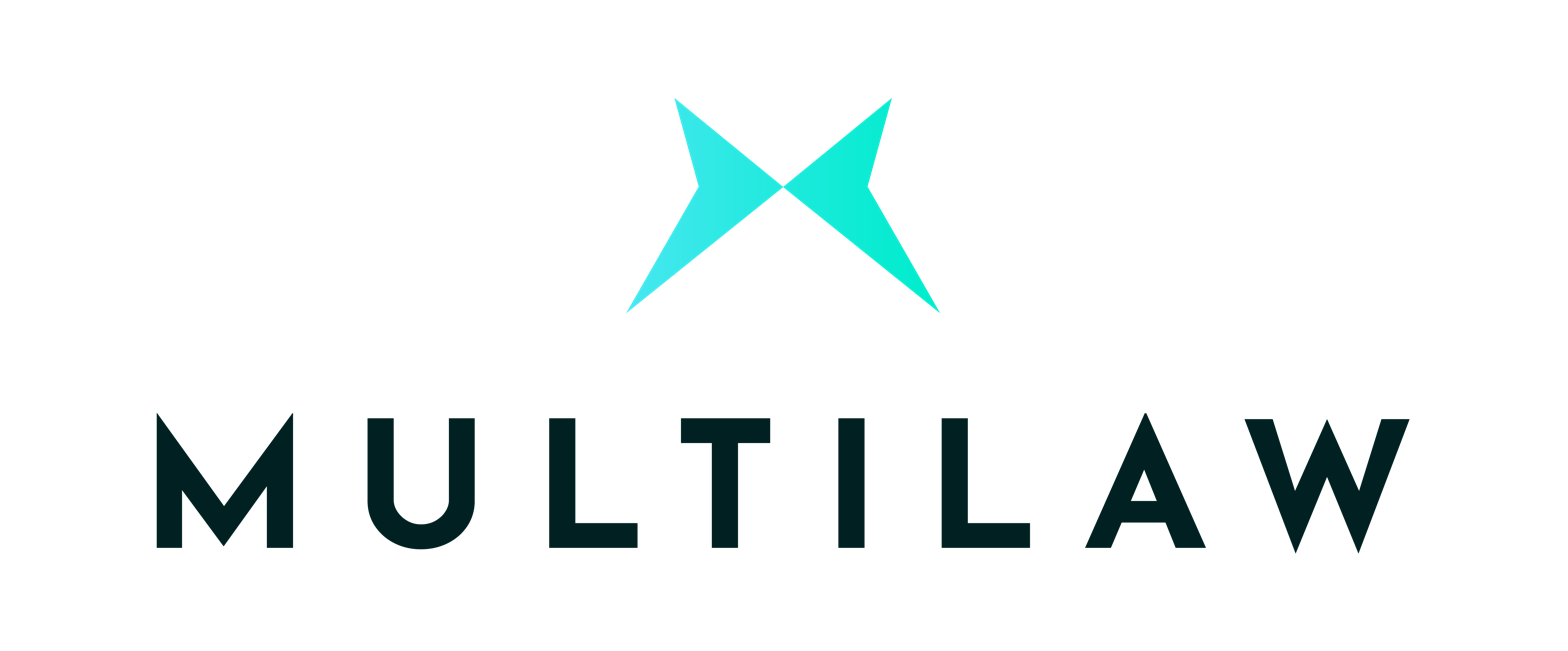
- Headquarters: London, UK
- Date founded: 1990
- Website: www.multilaw.com

Multilaw is an international professional services network of independent law firms. It was established in 1990 and comprises over 90 member firms in more than 100 countries. Multilaw has been ranked as an Elite network for the 12th year running by Chambers Global Guide 2026. In March 2017, at the Lawyer European Awards, Multilaw was named "2017 Global Network of the Year".

== Member firms ==
Multilaw member firms are individually selected for admission and all member firms are subject to an appraisal every three years. Multilaw has received recognition from Chambers and Partners for its "Business and corporate relationships frequently embracing ever-changing combinations of nations, continents, cultures, languages and laws."

== Governance ==
Multilaw is governed by a management committee and a board of directors consisting of representatives from three regions: EMEA, Asia Pacific and Americas with Adam Cooke as the Chief Executive. Multilaw operates from its global headquarters in London, UK.

Paul Kirton of Macpherson Kelley Australia, is the current Multilaw chairperson.

Malaysian lawyer Joanne Vengadesan of Pennington Manches Cooper has been announced as chairperson-elect and is set to take over from Kirton upon the expiry of his term in September 2027.
