= Pangalay =

Traditional Filipino dance native to the Tausūg people

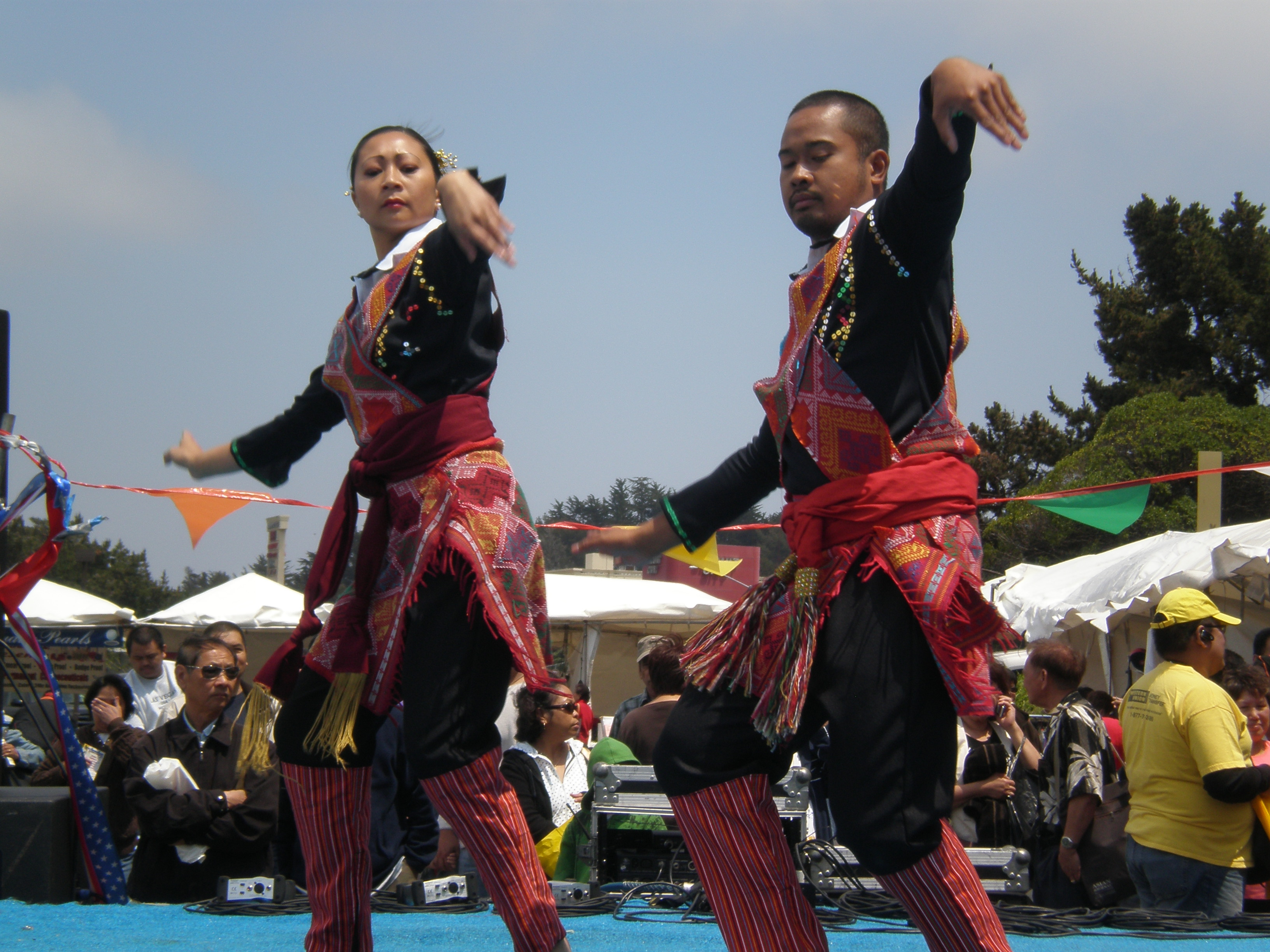
Pangalay performed at the 14th Annual Fil-Am Friendship Celebration at Serramonte Center in Daly City, California.

Pangalay (also known as Daling-Daling or Mengalai in Sabah) is the traditional "fingernail" dance of the Tausūg people of the Sulu Archipelago and eastern coast Bajau of Sabah.

The dance has a similarity to classical Balinese and Thai dances, and involves the movements of the shoulders, elbows, and wrists

The Pangalay is predominantly performed during weddings or other festive events. The male equivalent of the Pangalay is the Pangasik and features more martial movements, while a pangalay that features both a male and female dancer is called Pangiluk.

The original concept of the Pangalay is based on the pre-Islamic and Buddhist concept of male and female celestial angels (Sanskrit: Vidhyadhari, Tausug: Biddadari) common as characters in other Southeast Asian dances.

Neighbouring Sama-Bajau peoples in the Philippines call this type of dance, Umaral or Igal, and they sometimes use bamboo castanets as substitutes for long fingernails.

== Pakiring ==
A variant of the dance called Pakiring is practiced by the people of Mindanao, Sulu and Sabah. The dance emphasizes the sideways swaying movement of the hips (kiring-kiring).

A traditional song called Kiriring Pakiriring often accompanied the pakiring dance. The lyrics of the song are in the Sama language and are thought to have originated from Simunul, where the language is spoken.

A song based on the dance became widely popular nationwide in the Philippines when it was released in 1998 by Filipino cover band Gaya Band under the title Dayang Dayang (literally "princess of the first degree") after the song's chorus. The track first appeared on their album Best Of Tunog Hataw (Mega Dance Hits in Tagalog Version) and then as part of the compilation album titled Sayaw Pinoy released in 2000 through Dyna Records. Before this, the identity of the singer, its authenticity as the original and the language it was sung in remained a matter of debate for almost two decades, with speculations claiming that the singer was Malaysian or Tausug, and that the lyrics were seemingly gibberish. In 2024, the singer-songwriter of the original version was finally identified as Nur-Ainun Pangilan, known by her stage name Hainun. A Sama Dilaut singer from the island municipality of Sitangkai in Tawi-Tawi, she first recorded the song in 1996 for a Malaysian recording company across the border in Sabah. The lyrics are in her native Sama Dilaut language, and were apparently improvised. In her song, she describes the dance moves of her husband Al, who was with her during the recording sessions, and is mentioned in the line "Lahawla ngigal ngigal si Al" ("Lahawla, Al is dancing"). The actual title of the song on the original cassette tape was Dumba Dumba, and is apparently a Malay translation of the Sama kiring-kiring.

== See also ==
- Tagonggo
