= Graça Morais =

Portuguese artist

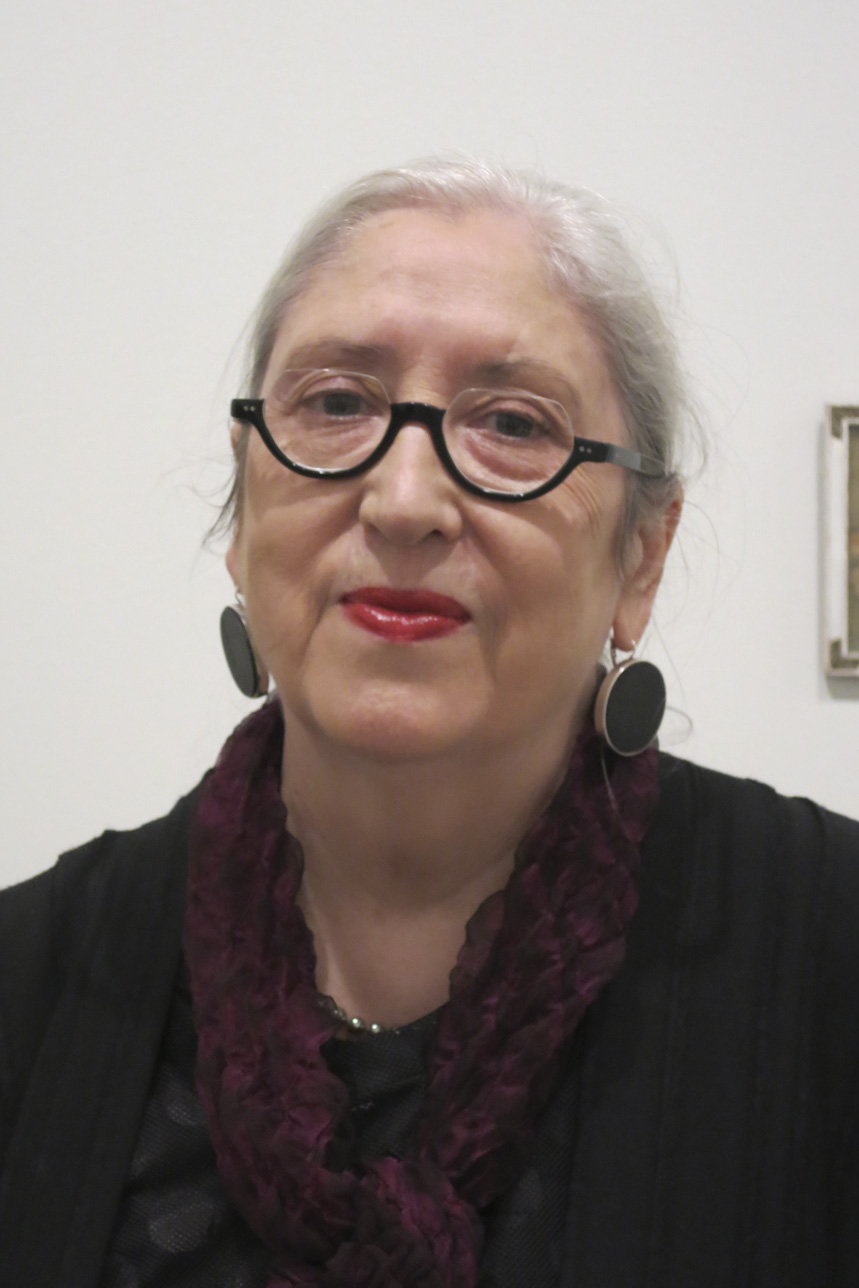
- Born: Maria da Graça Pinto de Almeida Morais; 17 March 1948; Freixiel, Vila Flor, Portugal
- Known for: Painting, drawing,
- Movement: Contemporary
- Spouse(s): 1. Jaime Silva; 2. Pedro Caldeira Cabral

Graça Morais GOIH (born 1948) is a Portuguese artist. A member of the Academia Nacional de Belas-Artes (National Academy of Fine Arts) of Portugal, she was made a Grand Officer of the Order of Prince Henry in 1997. She is married to the musician Pedro Caldeira Cabral.

== Early life and education ==
Maria da Graça Pinto de Almeida Morais was born on 17 March 1948 in the small village of Vieiro, in Freixiel, in the Trás-os-Montes region of northeast Portugal. She was the daughter of Alda Pinto and Jaime Morais, the second of six children. In 1957 and 1958 she lived in Mozambique, which is where her parents gave her a first box of watercolour paints. She first experimented with oil painting in 1964, copying paintings by Gustave Courbet. Morais attended schools in Vila Flor and Bragança before entering the Escola Superior de Belas-Artes do Porto (School of Fine Arts of Porto - ESBAP) in 1971, where she studied painting. In 1971 she married Jaime Silva, who was on the same course. They separated in 1985, having one daughter. From 1976 to 1979, she lived and studied in Paris, with a scholarship from the Calouste Gulbenkian Foundation.

== Career ==
In 1974 Morais held her first solo exhibition, at the Museu de Alberto Sampaio in the town of Guimarães. This was the beginning of a career that has included more than one hundred individual and collective exhibitions. While in Paris she founded the Puzzle Group, together with eight artists and an art critic, which, for two years, presented numerous exhibitions of paintings, installations and performances, including at the Salon de la Jeune Peinture in Paris, in 1977. While in Paris she got to know the painters Eduardo Arroyo and Bernard Rancillac, among others. In May 1978 she held a solo exhibition in Paris, entitled A Caça (The Hunt), at the Portuguese Cultural Centre.

Returning to Portugal in 1979, Morais moved to the capital of Lisbon and moved into an atelier there in 1980. However, in 1981 she returned to her birthplace, together with her daughter. In 1983 she held a solo exhibition in Lisbon. In the same year, José Sommer Ribeiro, director of the Calouste Gulbenkian Museum in Lisbon, invited her to be part of the Portuguese representation at the São Paulo Art Biennial in Brazil, after which she was invited to exhibit in São Paulo. In 1984 she produced twenty large-scale paintings/drawings, which were exhibited at the São Paulo Museum of Modern Art. In 1985 she participated in Féminie 85 at UNESCO in Paris, and exhibited at the World Trade Center in New York City, as part of an exhibition on Portuguese contemporary artists. In the same year, a book of her engravings, entitled Graça Morais: Linhas da Terra (Graça Morais: Earth Lines), with text by António Mega Ferreira, was published in a numbered and signed edition of 250.

Morais continued to exhibit in 1987, the year in which she began to construct an atelier in her home village of Vieiro. In 1988, at the request of the noted Portuguese writer, José Saramago, she illustrated a reprint of his book O Ano de 1993 (The Year of 1993). In the same year, she was the guest in London of the Portuguese-British artist, Paula Rego and her husband, Victor Willing, where she worked in a studio next to Rego's. She represented Portugal in the "Eighty" exhibition, which toured several European cities, and her works formed part of the Arte Contemporáneo Português exhibition at the Museo de Arte Contemporáneo (Madrid), the 70/80 Arte Portuguesa, in São Paulo and Rio de Janeiro, and the Five Portuguese Artists showing at the Art Society of the International Monetary Fund in Washington, D.C.

In 1988 and 1989, Morais was artist in residence in Cabo Verde, at the invitation of the Portuguese ambassador. In 1990 she exhibited in the then Portuguese colony of Macau, where she met her second husband, Pedro Caldeira Cabral, who was giving a guitar recital. They married in 1993. She was represented in an exhibition in New York City, entitled A Survey of Portuguese Art. In 1993, she designed the sets for The Screens, by Jean Genet, at the Teatro Experimental de Cascais, and, in 1995, the scenography and costumes for Richard II, by William Shakespeare, at the D. Maria II National Theatre in Lisbon.

Continuing to be very productive and to exhibit widely, she visited Moscow in 1996, in preparation for the installation of a work of azulejo tile panels in a metro station, which was done in 1997. She has worked on azulejos in several other locations, including at Fogueteiro train station in Seixal and at Amadora - Falagueira metro station in the Lisbon area; at the municipal market and municipal theatre of Bragança; in a bank and school in Bragança; in a clinic in Mirandela and in the Astrophysics and Planetarium Centre in Porto.

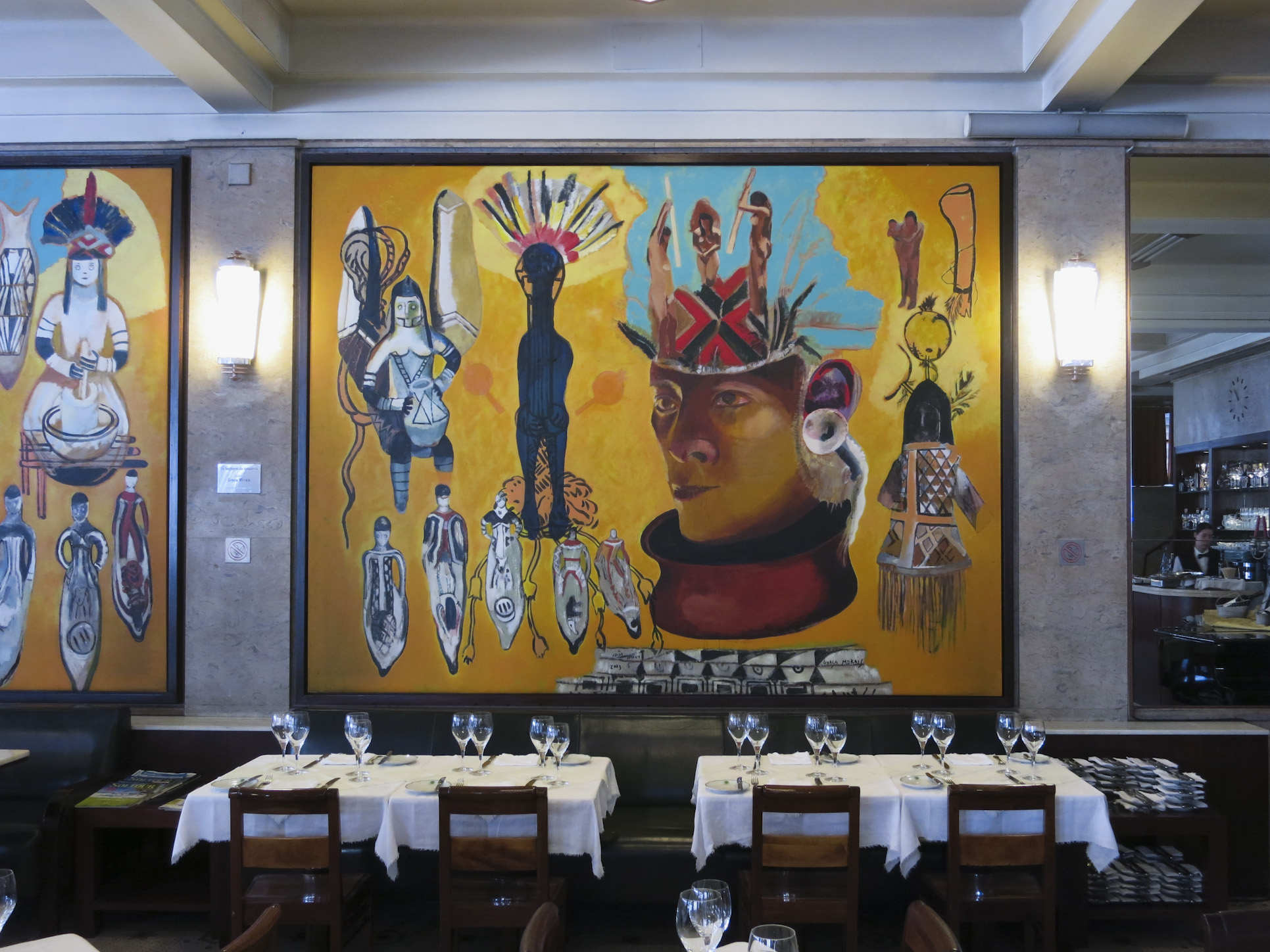
Os senhores da Amazónia, 2003, painting by Graça Morais in Café Guarany, Porto

In 2002, Morais and Miguel Torga published O Reino Maravilhoso, written by Torga with 49 illustrations by Morais. In 2004 she illustrated O Segredo da Mãe, by Nuno Júdice. In 2005, she published a book about her work, Uma Geografia da Alma, with contributions by Júdice, Fernando Pernes, Maria Velho da Costa, and others. During this period, she continued to exhibit on a regular basis, including at the Cascais Cultural Centre. In 2006 she collaborated with the Portuguese poet Sophia de Mello Breyner Andresen on an exhibition held in Lisbon. In 2006, a retrospective of her work was held at the Cordoaria Nacional in Belém, near Lisbon, while in 2007 she held exhibitions in Porto and Coimbra. In 2008, the Centro de Arte Contemporânea Graça Morais (CACGM) was opened in Bragança. Similar to the Casa das Histórias Paula Rego in Cascais, this gallery exhibits pieces from a permanent collection of the work of Morais, together with rotating exhibitions by other artists. In 2021 she donated a further 70 works of art to the museum.

Several wall tapestries of the work of Morais have been made by the Manufactura de Tapeçarias de Portalegre. They can be found in the Assembly of the Republic in Lisbon, at Lisbon City Council, at the Technical University of Lisbon, at the Mário Soares and Maria Barroso Foundation in Lisbon, and elsewhere.

Morais continued to exhibit in Portugal and elsewhere. From 2017 to 2019 she presented at the Champalimaud Foundation in Lisbon, at the Calouste Gulbenkian Foundation in Paris, and at the National Museum of Contemporary Art in Lisbon, among others. In July 2018, the tenth anniversary of the CACGM was celebrated with the establishment of the Laboratory of Arts in the Mountain – Graça Morais (LAM – GM) to promote opportunities for teaching and research activities based on the practice of arts in a mountain context. In 2021 her work was included in an exhibition of the work of 40 Portuguese women at the Calouste Gulbenkian Museum entitled All I Want (Tudo O Que Eu Quero)

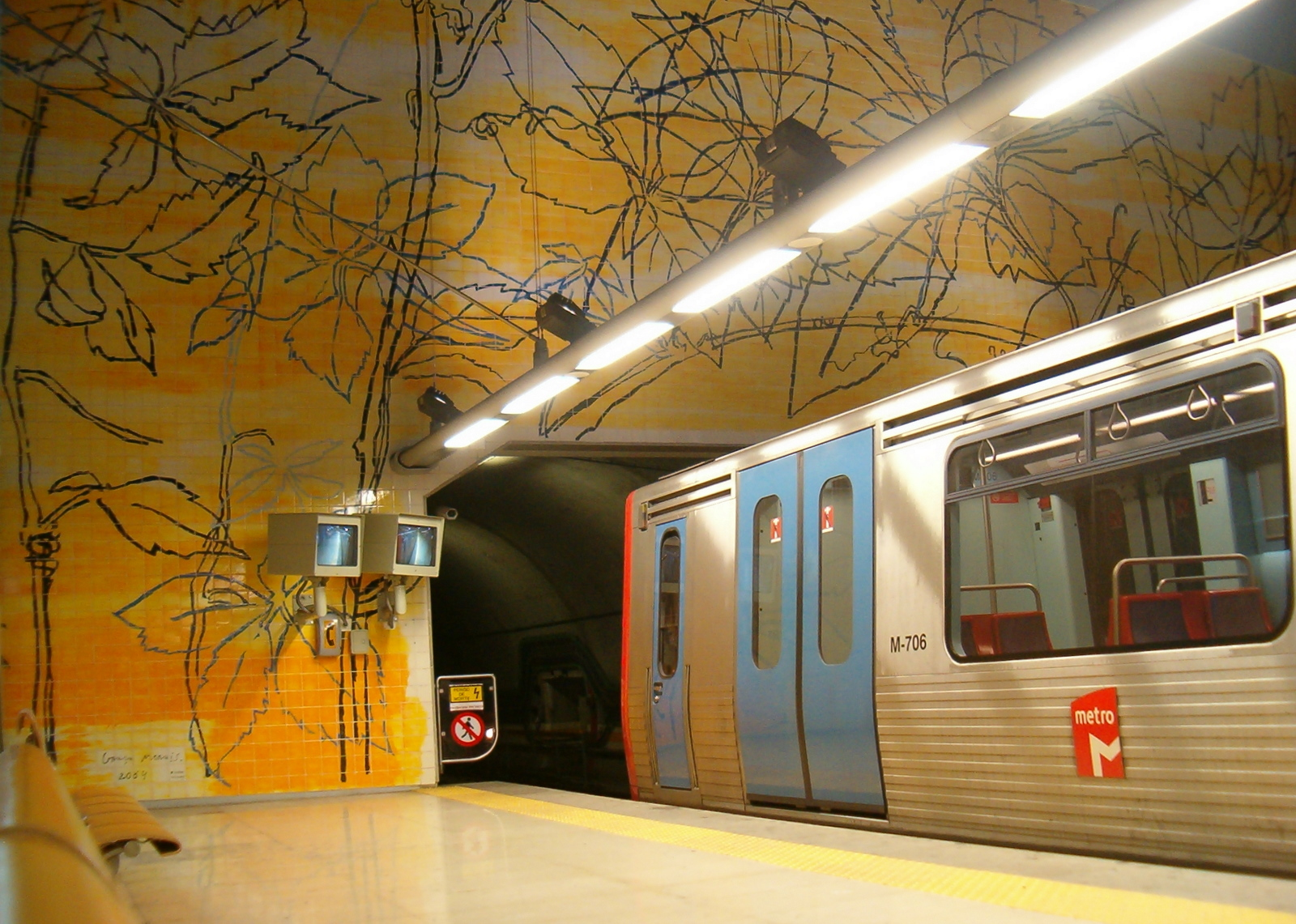
Wall tiles by Morais at the Amadora - Falagueira metro station in Lisbon

== Films about Morais ==
The life and work of Graça Morais have been the subject of the film documentaries As Escolhidas (The Chosen - 1997) by Margarida Gil, Na Cabeça de uma Mulher está a História de uma Aldeia (In the Head of a Woman is the Story of a Village - 1999) by Joana Morais, and Graça Morais e os Escritores (Graça Morais and the Writers - 2017) by Luís Alves de Matos.

== Awards and honours ==
Morais won the SocTip Award for Artist of the Year, in 1991. She was made a Grand Officer of the Order of Prince Henry in 1997. In 2011 she received the Arts Prize - Casino da Póvoa and, in 2013, the Grand Prize Acquisition of the Portuguese National Academy of Fine Arts. She also received the Women Creators of Culture award in 2014. In 2016, she was given the "Life’s Work" Award by SOS Azulejo. In 2017, she received the Gold Medal of Cultural and Scientific Merit, from the town of Vila Nova de Gaia and, in 2018, she was the recipient of the Medal of Honour of the Polytechnic Institute of Bragança (IPB). In March 2019, she was awarded the Portuguese Medal of Cultural Merit. In May 2022 Morais was awarded an honorary doctorate by the University of Trás-os-Montes and Alto Douro (UTAD).
