= Desgarrada =

Traditional freestyle music from northern Portugal

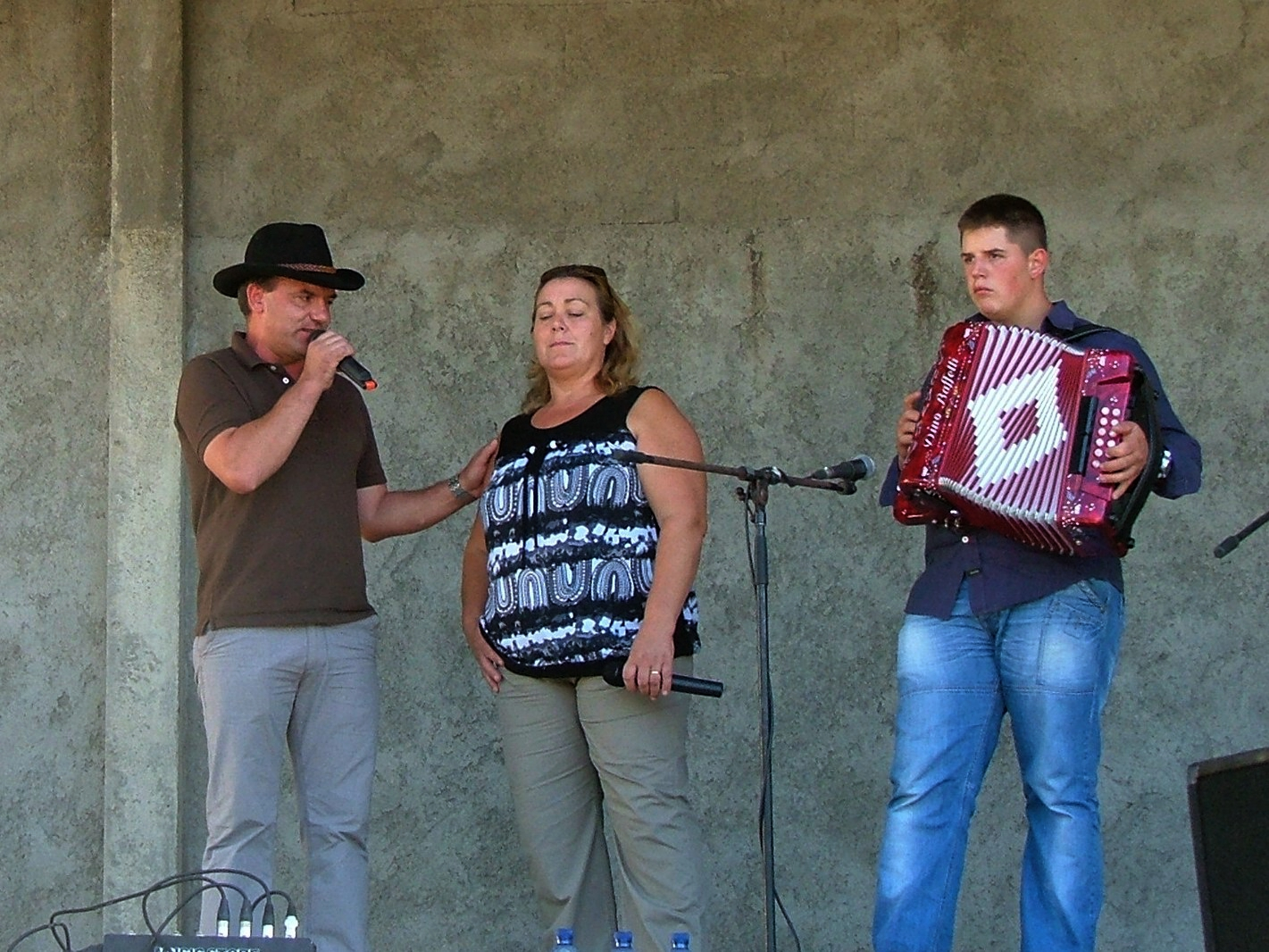
- A Desgarrada in Castro Daire, in 2011.
- Other names: Cantares ao Desafio; Cantigas ao Desafio; Cantigas à Desgarrada
- Stylistic origins: Galician-Portuguese lyric
- Cultural origins: Medieval northern Portugal
- Typical instruments: Vocals; Concertina; Harmonica; Accordion; Portuguese guitar
- Derivative forms: Minho; Douro Litoral; Beira Alta

Regional scenes
- Northern Portugal

Desgarrada is a popular song from northern Portugal, in which singers improvise, challenge and respond to each other, usually to the sound of a concertina. In addition to the name Desgarradas, they are also called Cantares ao Desafio, Cantigas ao Desafio or Cantigas à Desgarrada.

The term is also used to characterise a form of fado interpretation, in this case with Portuguese guitar and viola accompaniment, with well-known interpreters such as Fernando Maurício or Vicente da Câmara. Among the artists who recorded desgarradas we can find names such as Quim Barreiros, Zé Amaro, Augusto Canário, or even Rosinha or Jorge Ferreira, who visited this genre several times.

== History ==
Linked to festive occasions, such as romarias, fairs, desfolhadas, or at singer gatherings, desgarradas can eventually be heard all over Portugal, although the traditions are deepest in Trás-os-Montes, Minho provinces, Douro Litoral and Beira Alta.

In desgarradas, for several minutes, themes such as mockery, love, hatred, faith and charity are addressed, improvising the rhymes and responding, preferably in a jocular way, to the other singer. Desgarradas have troubadourian origins.

In 2005, the "cantares ao desafio" and the galician "regueifas" were part of the "Galician-Portuguese oral tradition" application to UNESCO for Intangible Cultural Heritage status, however it was rejected due to the application being deemed as "too broad".

== Organizations ==
- Associação de Cantadores ao Desafio e Tocadores de Concertinas da Beira Alta, in Castro Daire.
- Associação de Tocadores e Cantadores ao Desafio Famalicense, in Gavião.
- Associação Cultural Desportiva Recreativa dos Amigos Tocadores de Concertinas do Concelho de Ponte de Lima, in Ponte de Lima.
- Associação Popular de Cantares ao Desafio de Vila Nova de Famalicão, in Vila Nova de Famalicão.

== See also ==
- Payada
- Mata-kantiga
- Dondang Sayang
