= Tradisom =

Tradisom Produções Culturais Lda.
- Founded: 1992
- Founder: José Moças
- Genre: Folk, World music, Fado, Classical music
- Country of origin: Portugal
- Location: Vila Verde
- Official website: www.tradisom.com

Tradisom is a Portuguese folk record label and book publisher founded in 1992 in Macau.

Considered an important collector of 78rpm discs, José Moças founded Tradisom in 1992 when he worked in Macau, part of the Portuguese Empire till 1999.

Since then, Tradisom issued collections of historic recordings, including Fado, Cante Alentejano, World music and traditional Portuguese music from Portugal and throughout the world (e.g. Dondang Sayang and Mata-kantiga).

The list of contemporary artists recording for Tradisom includes Pedro Caldeira Cabral, Júlio Pereira and Brigada Víctor Jara.

The label also releases classical music, including works of composer Vianna da Motta, music by violinist Carlos Damas and historic recordings of Lomelino Silva, the portuguese Caruso.

Along with CDs and vinyl, Tradisom also publishes music related books.

== See also ==
- List of record labels
- Music of Portugal
