= Mata-kantiga =

Malay music genre

Mata-Kantiga
- Stylistic origins: Music of Malaysia
- Cultural origins: Malaysia

Mata-kantiga (from old Portuguese, literally meaning, “kill the song”) is a Malay genre of music of Portuguese origin, very similar to other Portuguese folk music, like the Desgarrada (Portugal), to Repente, Cururu and Trova (Brazil).

Cultivated mainly in the area of Malacca (in Malaysia), it's a type of song where a man and a woman change improvised verses, divided generally in three types: romantic (cantigas de amigo, Portuguese for "songs of friendship"), mock (cantigas de mal dizer, Portuguese for "songs of ill-saying") and miscellaneous.

In the old days, some couples participated in sung duels and each partner used different verses mata-kantiga to seduce or to mock the other while the remaining hearing audience danced another sort of Malay music, also of Portuguese origin, called Branyo.

Mata-kantiga was accompanied by the violin, rebana (small tambourine) and drum (of double face, Portuguese style). Currently in disuse, its last great exponent was the singer and poet Rosil de Costa, deceased in 1986.

A very similar sort of music genre, also of Portuguese influence and from the same region, called Dondang Sayang predominates nowadays.

== See also ==
- Music of Malaysia
- Dondang Sayang

== Bibliography ==
- Sarkissian, Margaret. Kantiga di Padri sa chang. From the collection "Viagem dos Sons", Tradisom, Vila Verde, Portugal, 1998
- Silva Rego, Padre António da. "Apontamentos para o estudo do dialecto português de Malaca". Boletim Geral das Colônias, Lisboa, Portugal, 1941.
