= Corridinho =

Portuguese folk dance

The corridinho is a form of Portuguese folk dance, namely in the Algarve region. The origin of the dance itself is unclear and believed older, although it gained popularity in the 1800s. The name derives from correr, to run which partly describes this type of dance. The dance was performed in a round (dança de roda) in the open air. The oldest musical instruments recorded were small flutes or fifes (pífaro) and harmonicas, (harmónica) until the accordion was implemented and dominated ever since.

Corridinho has left a legacy and is still popular in some former Portuguese colonies like Goa, Daman and Diu, Dadra and Nagar Haveli, Mangalore in India and a small part of Ceylon (Sri Lanka) where it is called Baila. In Macau China, it is known as Portuguese-Macaense folk dance. The Branyo, a folk dance of the Kristang people in Malaysia, derives from the Corridinho, and further developed into the popular Malay Joget dance.

In Portugal today, the dance is mainly found in the southern region of Faro in the Algarve and is often performed by the ranchos folcloricos (folk groups) as part of the municipality's tourist attraction.

The corridinho is considered a product of history and performance that represent Algarvian contexts (e.g. Algarve life depicted in plain sound and loud talking). It is danced by couples who always move together. They form a circle with the girls inside and the boys on the outside. By rotating the circle, the pairs move side by side. Corridinho is composed of three parts: o corrido, o rodado e an escovinha (the run, the rotation, and cropped). The "Run" starts with a circle, made up of pairs of men and women. When the music starts, the pairs begin to spin. To start the "Rotation", the beat gets more lively and intense, the pairs begin to perform a "fast-paced waltz". When said is done, the dancers return to their original positions and can either end there or continue. The "Cropped" is a shorter version of the dance done again after a complete round cycle.

Although bearing some resemblance to the polka and mazurka, corridinho is a very traditional Portuguese dance where people challenge each other's fitness and enjoy social entertainment in groups.
