= Mário Soares =

Portuguese statesman (1924–2017)

His Excellency Mário Soares GColTE GCC GColL
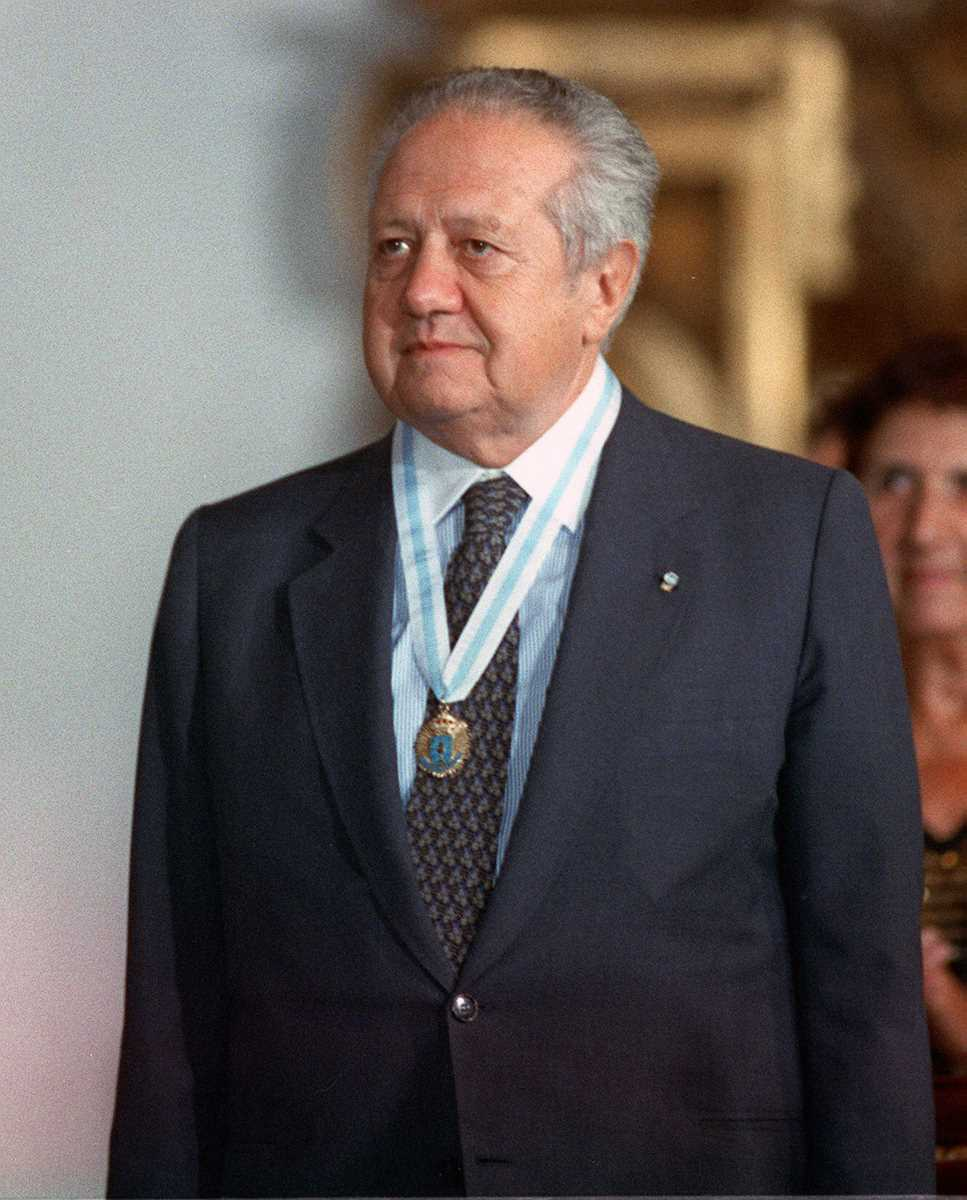
- Soares in 1993

President of Portugal
- In office 9 March 1986 – 9 March 1996
- Prime Minister: Aníbal Cavaco Silva; António Guterres
- Preceded by: António Ramalho Eanes
- Succeeded by: Jorge Sampaio

Prime Minister of Portugal
- In office 9 June 1983 – 6 November 1985
- President: António Ramalho Eanes
- Deputy: Carlos Mota Pinto; Rui Machete
- Preceded by: Francisco Pinto Balsemão
- Succeeded by: Aníbal Cavaco Silva
- In office 23 July 1976 – 28 August 1978
- President: António Ramalho Eanes
- Preceded by: José Pinheiro de Azevedo
- Succeeded by: Alfredo Nobre da Costa

Minister of Foreign Affairs
- In office 12 October 1977 – 30 January 1978
- Prime Minister: Himself
- Preceded by: José Medeiros Ferreira
- Succeeded by: Vítor de Sá Machado
- In office 15 May 1974 – 26 March 1975
- Prime Minister: Adelino da Palma Carlos; Vasco Gonçalves
- Preceded by: National Salvation Junta
- Succeeded by: Ernesto Melo Antunes

Minister without Portfolio
- In office 26 March 1975 – 8 August 1975
- Prime Minister: Vasco Gonçalves
- Preceded by: Ernesto Melo Antunes; Vítor Alves
- Succeeded by: Jorge Campinos

Secretary-General of the Socialist Party
- In office 19 April 1973 – 29 June 1986
- President: António Macedo
- Preceded by: Office established
- Succeeded by: Vítor Constâncio

Member of the European Parliament
- In office 20 July 1999 – 19 July 2004
- Constituency: Portugal

Member of the Assembly of the Republic
- In office 2 June 1975 – 3 November 1985
- Constituency: Lisbon

Personal details
- Born: Mário Alberto Nobre Lopes Soares; 7 December 1924 Lisbon, Portugal
- Died: 7 January 2017 (aged 92) Lisbon, Portugal
- Resting place: Prazeres Cemetery, Lisbon
- Party: Socialist Party (1973–2017)
- Other political affiliations: Portuguese Communist Party (1943–1950); Portuguese Socialist Action (1964–1973)
- Spouse: Maria Barroso (m. 1949; died 2015)
- Children: João; Isabel
- Education: University of Lisbon; Pantheon-Sorbonne University
- Profession: Historian; Lawyer; Professor
- Website: Mário Soares Foundation

Mário Alberto Nobre Lopes Soares GColTE, GCC, GColL (European Portuguese: [ˈmaɾju alˈβɛɾtu ˈnɔβɾɨ ˈlɔpɨʃ suˈaɾɨʃ]; 7 December 1924 – 7 January 2017) was a Portuguese statesman who served as prime minister of Portugal from 1976 to 1978 and from 1983 to 1985 and subsequently as the president of Portugal from 1986 to 1996. He was the first secretary-general of the Socialist Party, from its foundation in 1973 to 1986. A major political figure in Portugal, he is considered the father of Portuguese democracy.

== Family ==
Soares was the son of João Lopes Soares (Leiria, Arrabal, 17 November 1879 – Lisbon, Campo Grande, 31 July 1970), founder of the Colégio Moderno in Lisbon, government minister and then anti-fascist republican activist who had been a priest before impregnating and marrying Elisa Nobre Baptista (Santarém, Pernes, 8 September 1887 – Lisbon, Campo Grande, 28 February 1955), Mário Soares's mother, at the 7th Conservatory of the Civil Register of Lisbon on 5 September 1934. His father also had another son by an unknown mother named Tertuliano Lopes Soares. His mother had previously been married and had two children, J. Nobre Baptista and Cândido Nobre Baptista. Mário Soares was raised as a Roman Catholic, but came to identify himself as a republican, secular and socialist.

== Early life ==
Soares was born in the Coração de Jesus neighbourhood of Lisbon, and graduated in history and philosophy from the University of Lisbon. He became a university lecturer in 1957, but his activities in opposition to the dictatorship of António de Oliveira Salazar led to repeated arrests. He was active in resistance groups such as the Movement for Anti-Fascist National Unity and the Movement for Democratic Unity.

Soares began his studies at Colégio Moderno, owned by his father. There, for a short period he was taught geography by Álvaro Cunhal, who would later become the towering figure of Portuguese Communism and one of Soares' greatest political rivals.

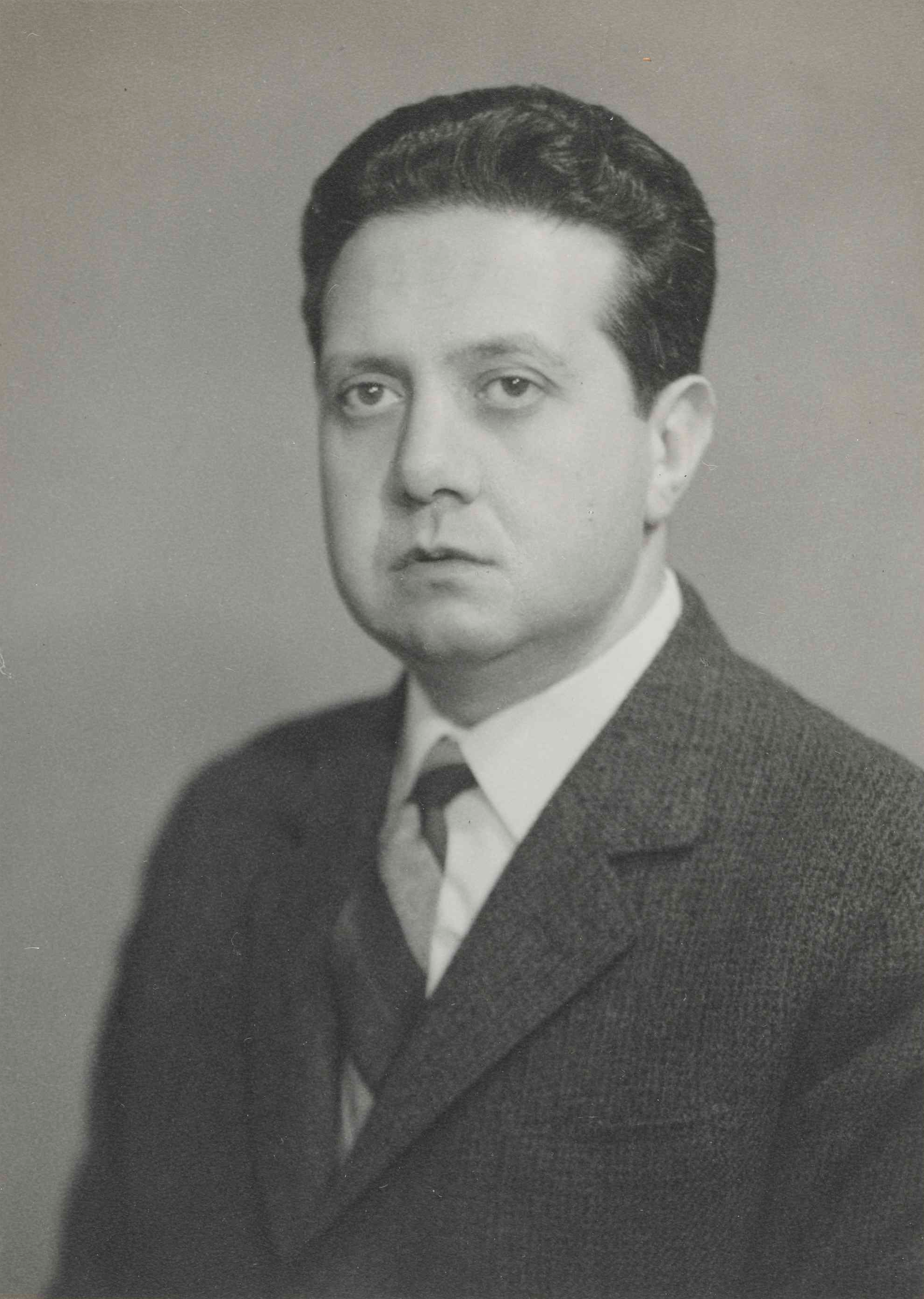
Mário Soares in the 1950s.

While a student at university, Soares joined the Portuguese Communist Party, being responsible for the youth section. In this capacity, he organised demonstrations in Lisbon to celebrate the end of World War II. He was first arrested by PIDE, the Portuguese political police, in 1946, when he was a member of the Central Committee of the Movement of Democratic Unity (Portuguese: Movimento de Unidade Democrática), at the time chaired by Mário de Azevedo Gomes. Soares was arrested twice in 1949. On those latter occasions, he was the secretary of General Norton de Matos, a candidate for the Presidency. However, he became estranged from de Matos when he latter discovered Soares's Communist sympathies.

Soares married Maria de Jesus Barroso Soares, an actress, on 22 February 1949, while in the Aljube prison, at the Third Conservatory of the Civil Register of Lisbon. They had a son, João Soares, who later became Mayor of Lisbon, and a daughter, Isabel Barroso Soares (born in 1951), who now manages the Colégio Moderno.

Soares's multiple arrests for political activism made it impossible for him to continue with his career as a lecturer of history and philosophy. Therefore, he decided to study law and become an attorney.

== Political activity during the Estado Novo ==
In 1958, Soares was very active in the presidential election supporting General Humberto Delgado. Later, he would become Delgado's family lawyer, when Humberto Delgado was murdered in 1965, in Spain, by agents of the dictatorship's secret police (PIDE). As a lawyer, he defended some of Portugal's political prisoners and participated in numerous trials conducted in the Plenary Court and in the Special Military Court. Represented, particularly, Álvaro Cunhal when he was accused of several political crimes, and along with Adelino da Palma Carlos he also defended the dynastic cause of Maria Pia of Saxe-Coburg and Gotha Braganza.

In April 1964, in Geneva, Switzerland, Soares together with Francisco Ramos da Costa and Manuel Tito de Morais created the Acção Socialista Portuguesa (Portuguese Socialist Action). At this point he was already quite distant from his former Communist friends (having quit the Communist Party in 1951); his views were now clearly inclined towards economic liberalism.

In March 1968, Soares was arrested again by PIDE, and a military tribunal sentenced him to banishment in the colony of São Tomé and Principe in the Gulf of Guinea. His wife and two children, Isabel and João, accompanied him. However, they returned to Lisbon eight months later for in the meantime dictator Salazar had been replaced by Marcello Caetano. The new dictator wanted to present a more democratic face to the world, so many political prisoners, Soares among them, were released and allowed exile in France.

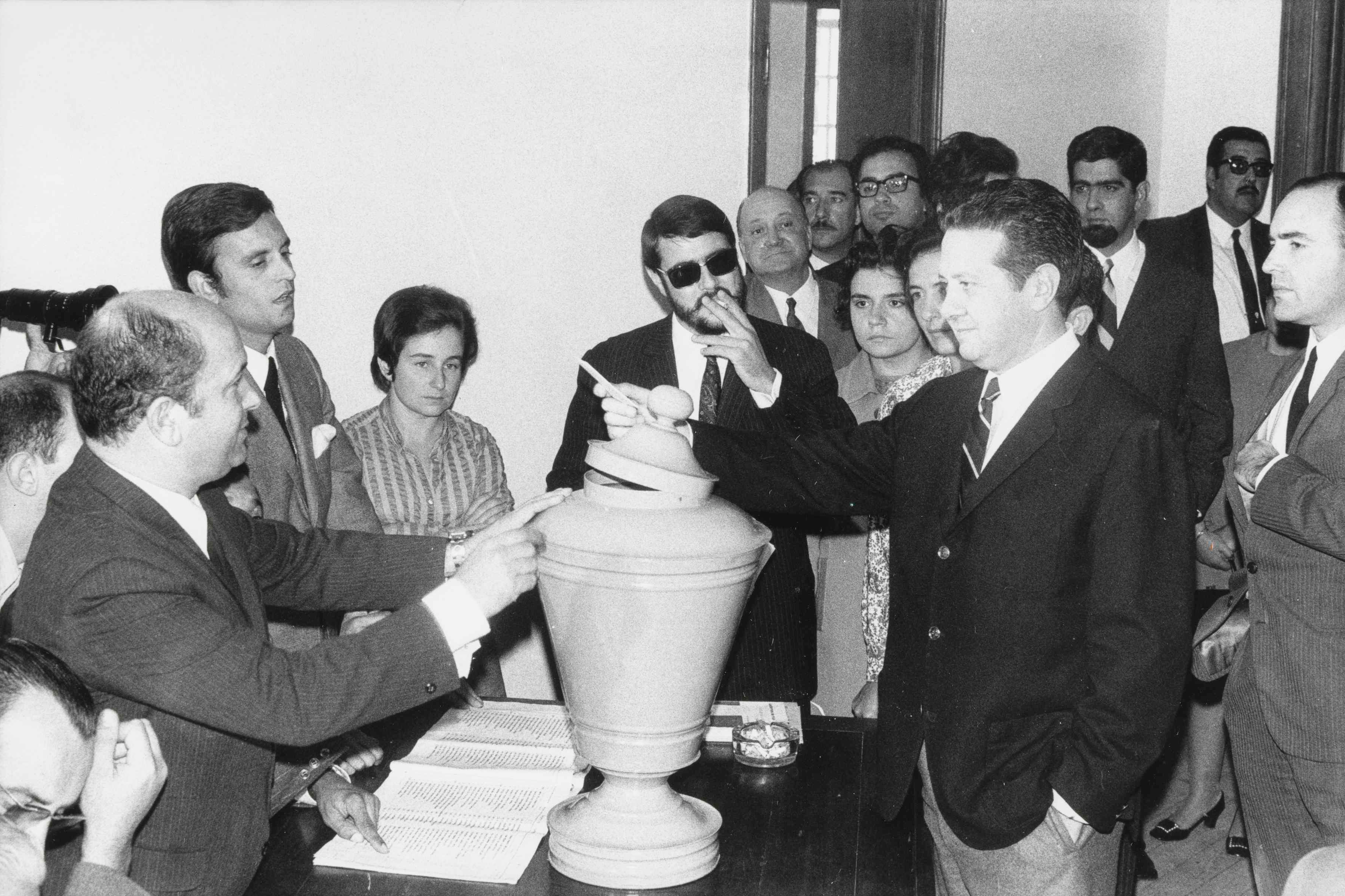
Mário Soares casting his ballot in the 1969 legislative election.

In the October 1969 general election, which was rigged, the democratic opposition (whose political rights were severely restricted) entered with two different lists. Soares participated actively in the campaign supporting the Coligação Eleitoral de Unidade Democrática or CEUD (Electoral Coalition for Democratic Unity). CEUD was clearly anti-fascist, but they also reaffirmed their opposition to Communism.

In 1970, Soares was exiled to Rome, Italy, but eventually settled in France where he taught at the Universities of Vincennes, Paris and Rennes. In 1973, the 'Portuguese Socialist Action' became the Socialist Party, and Soares was elected Secretary-General. The Socialist party was created under the umbrella of Willy Brandt's SPD in Bad Münstereifel, Germany, on 19 April 1973.

== Carnation Revolution ==
On 25 April 1974, elements of the Portuguese Army seized power in Lisbon, overthrowing Salazar's successor, Marcello Caetano. Soares and other political exiles returned home to celebrate what was termed the "Carnation Revolution".

In the provisional government which was formed after the revolution, led by the Movement of the Armed Forces (MFA), Soares became minister for overseas negotiations, charged with organising the independence of Portugal's overseas colonies. Among other encounters, he met with Samora Machel, the leader of Frelimo, to negotiate the independence of Mozambique.

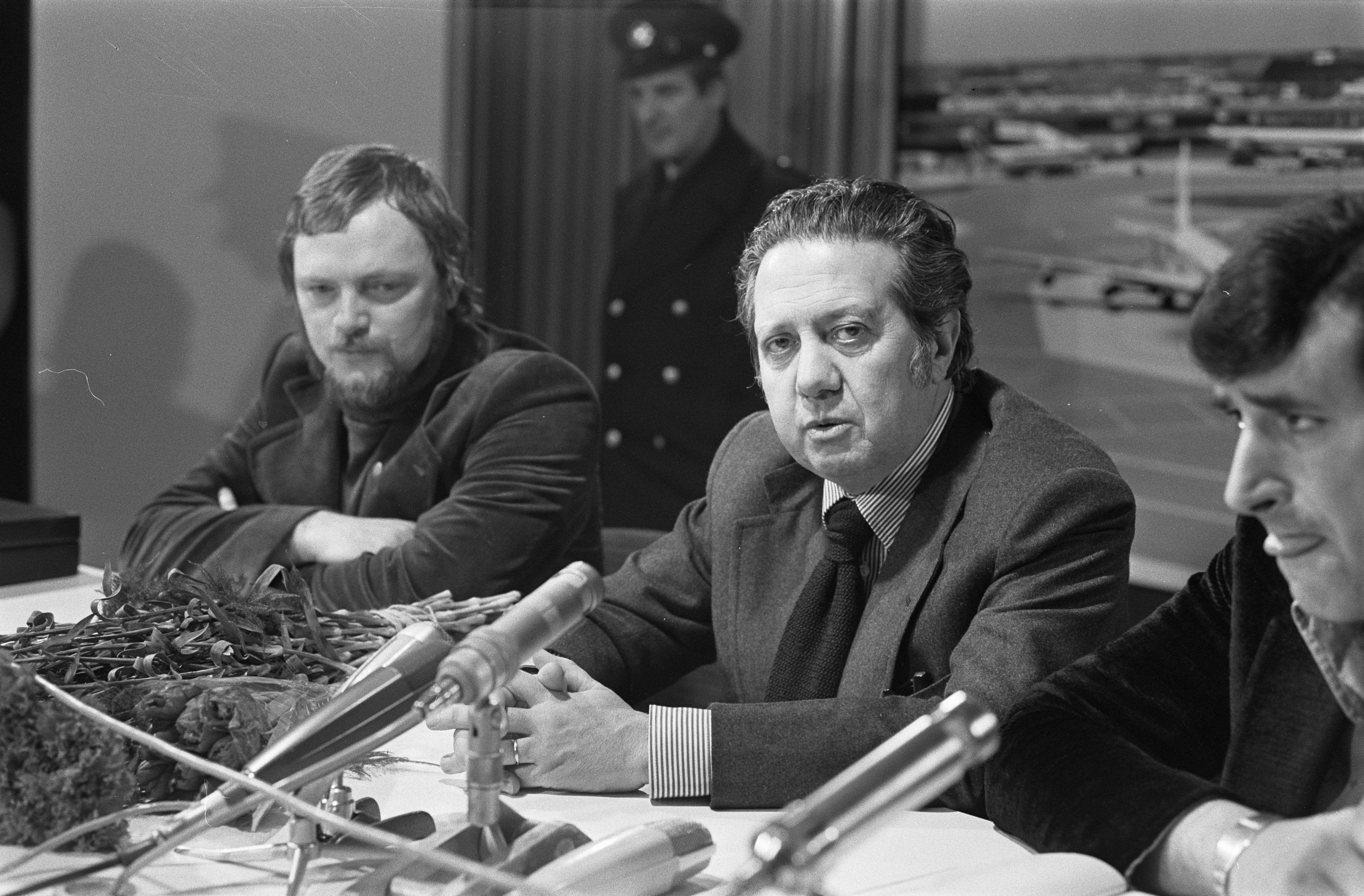
Mário Soares during a press conference at Schiphol airport, 1975.

Within months of the revolution however (and in spite of the April 1975 Constituent Assembly election results which gave victory to the Socialist Party and clearly favored the pro-democracy political parties), it became apparent that the Portuguese Communist Party, allied with a radical group of officers in the MFA, was attempting to extend its control over the government. The prime minister, Vasco dos Santos Gonçalves, was accused of being an agent of the Communists and a bitter confrontation developed between the Socialists and Communists over control of the newspaper República.

President Francisco da Costa Gomes dismissed Vasco Gonçalves in September 1975 and a failed far-left coup in late November ended the far-left influence in Portuguese government and politics. After the approval of the 1976 Constitution, a democratic government was finally established when national elections were held on 25 April 1976.

== Prime minister ==
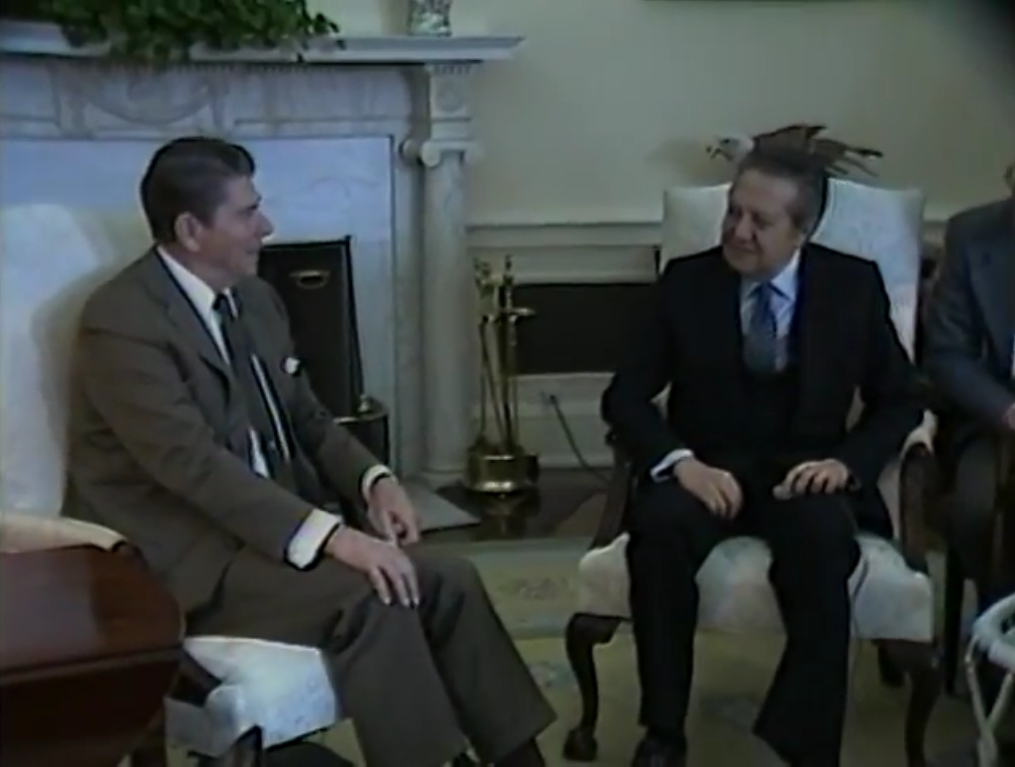
Prime Minister Mário Soares meeting with U.S. president Ronald Reagan at the White House, 1984.

The 1976 legislative election gave the Socialists a plurality of seats in the newly created Assembly of the Republic and Soares became prime minister. Deep hostility between the Socialists and the Communists made a left-wing majority government impossible, and Soares formed a weak minority government. Vast fiscal and currency account deficits generated by previous governments forced Soares to adopt a strict austerity policy, which made him deeply unpopular. Soares had to resign from office after only two years, in 1978.

The wave of left-wing sentiment which followed the 1974 revolution had now dissipated, and a succession of conservative governments held office until 1983, with Soares' Socialist Party unsuccessful in the 1979 special elections and 1980 elections. Soares again became prime minister following the 1983 elections, holding office until late 1985. His main achievement in office was negotiating Portugal's entry into the European Economic Community. Portugal at the time was very wary of integrating itself into the EEC, and Soares almost single-handedly turned public opinion around.

== Presidency ==
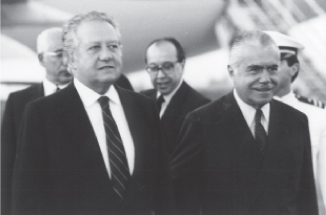
President Mário Soares with Brazilian President José Sarney, 1988.

In the 1986 presidential election, Soares was elected president of Portugal, beating Diogo Freitas do Amaral by little more than 2%. He was reelected in 1991, this time with almost 70% of the vote. For most of Soares' two terms of office, Portugal was governed by the centre-right Social Democratic Party, led by Aníbal Cavaco Silva.

In 1989, he was the first foreign head of state to visit Czechoslovakia in the course of the Velvet Revolution, invited by Václav Havel, who was elected president of Czechoslovakia two days later.

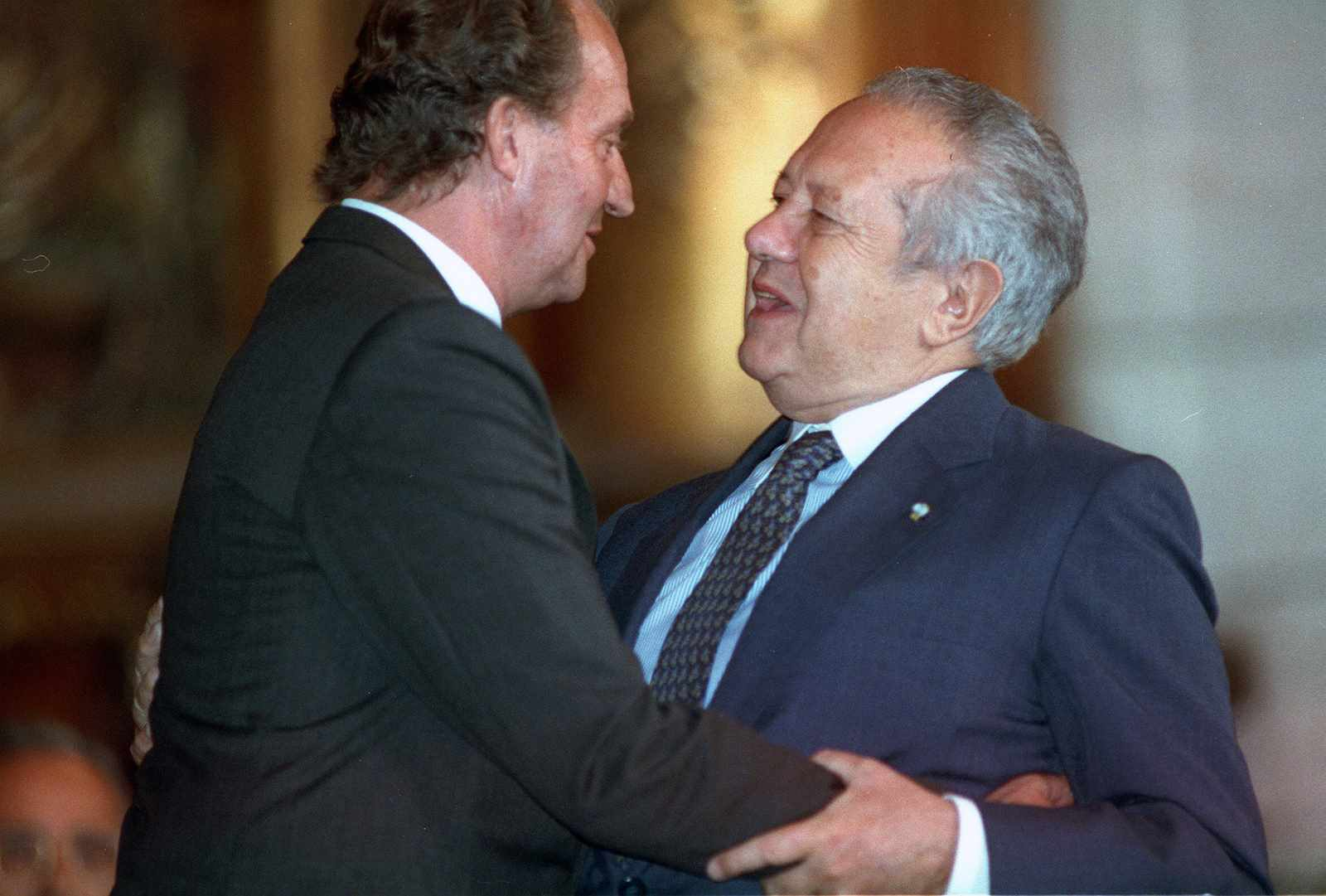
President Mário Soares with Spanish King Juan Carlos I, 1993.

He devised the so-called Presidência Aberta (Open Presidency), a series of tours around the country, each addressing a particular issue, such as the environment or a particular region of Portugal. Although generally well received by the public, some claimed that he was criticizing the government and exceeding his constitutional role. Others stated that the tours were in the style of medieval courts. Yet the name stuck for today's presidential initiatives of the same type.

== Post-Presidency ==
- Soares retired in 1996, but in 1998 he headed the Independent World Commission on the Oceans.
- In 1999 he headed the Socialist ticket in elections to the European Parliament, where he served until the 2004 elections. He ran for President of the Parliament, but lost to Nicole Fontaine.
- In 2000 he was awarded the North-South Prize.
- Soares was a member of the Club de Madrid, an independent organization of more than 80 former democratic statesmen from around the world. The group works to strengthen democratic governance and leadership.
- In March 2005, he launched a petition urging the European Union to start membership talks with Cape Verde.
- On 30 August 2005, he announced his candidacy to run for president in the election that occurred on 22 January 2006, when he was 81 years old. However, he lost the election to Aníbal Cavaco Silva and was even behind Manuel Alegre, receiving 14% of the vote. "The results went against my expectations. I accept this defeat with a feeling of mission accomplished," he said. It was suggested (on the RTP1 TV programme Prós e Contras in March 2008) that one of the reasons for his weak support could be that the Portuguese were reluctant to elect any president for more than two terms (only allowed by the Portuguese Constitution of 1976 if non-consecutive).

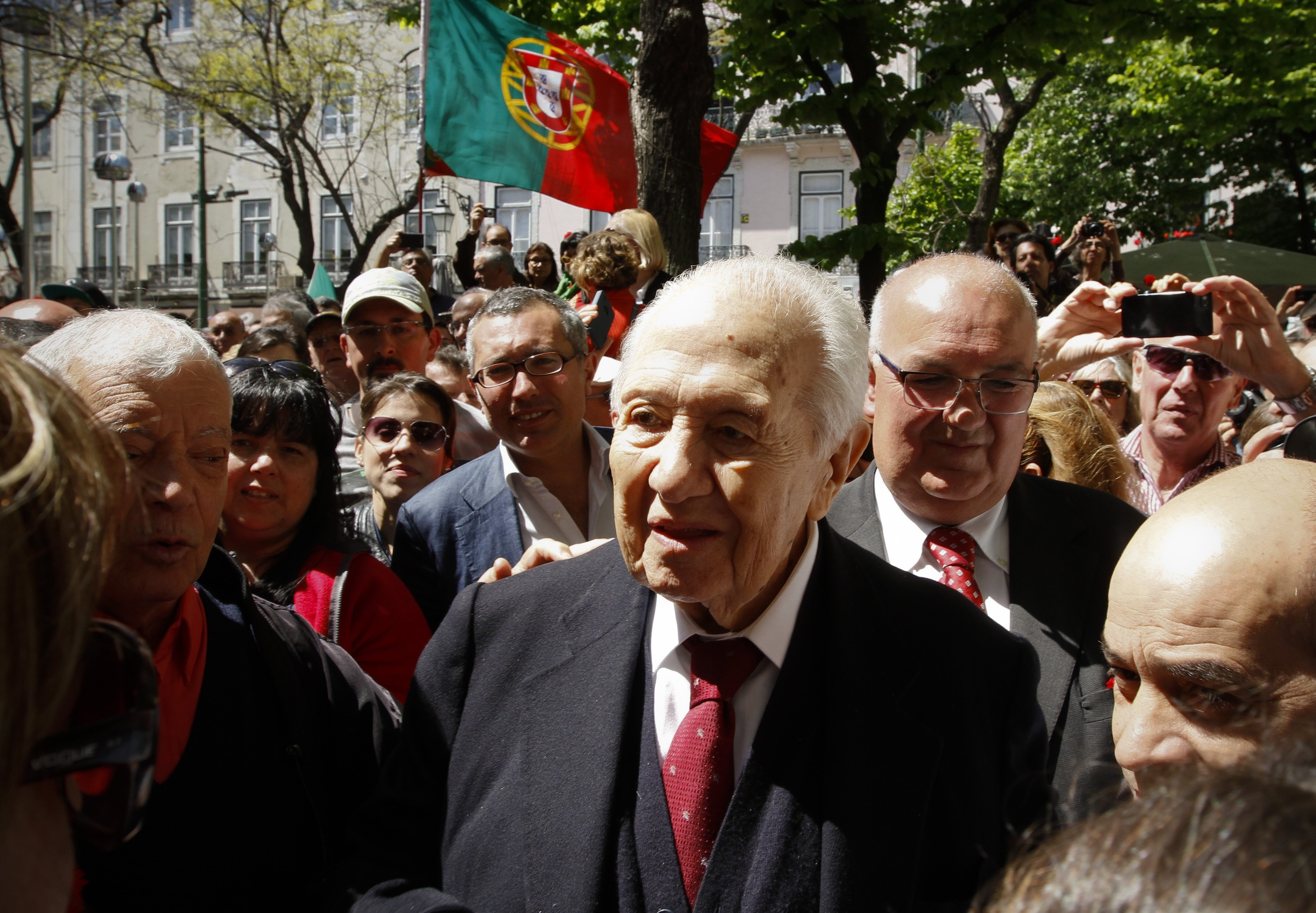
Soares attending a rally in Lisbon to celebrate the 40th anniversary of the Carnation Revolution, 25 April 2014

- In the TV programme Os Grandes Portugueses (English: The Greatest Portuguese), he was voted 12th, the highest-placed among living people chosen by the public.
- He was a member of the strongest Masonic lodge in Portugal.
- He was president of the then Mário Soares Foundation (Portuguese: Fundação Mário Soares (FMS)).
- He sat on the board of directors of the Orient Foundation (Portuguese: Fundação Oriente).
- He was a Member of the Portuguese Council of State, as a former elected president of Portugal.
- After the Finnish general elections on 17 April 2011, Soares opined that "Finland has changed into an extremely conservative country, where solidarity is unknown." Soares evoked the memory of Kalevi Sorsa, contrasting his generosity with "those dwarfs, who now want to rule Finland, their ethical values and hostility to Portugal". According to Soares the Finns live in an illusion, believing that "speculative markets and credit criminals can destroy nations with nine hundred years' independent history".

== Death and state funeral ==
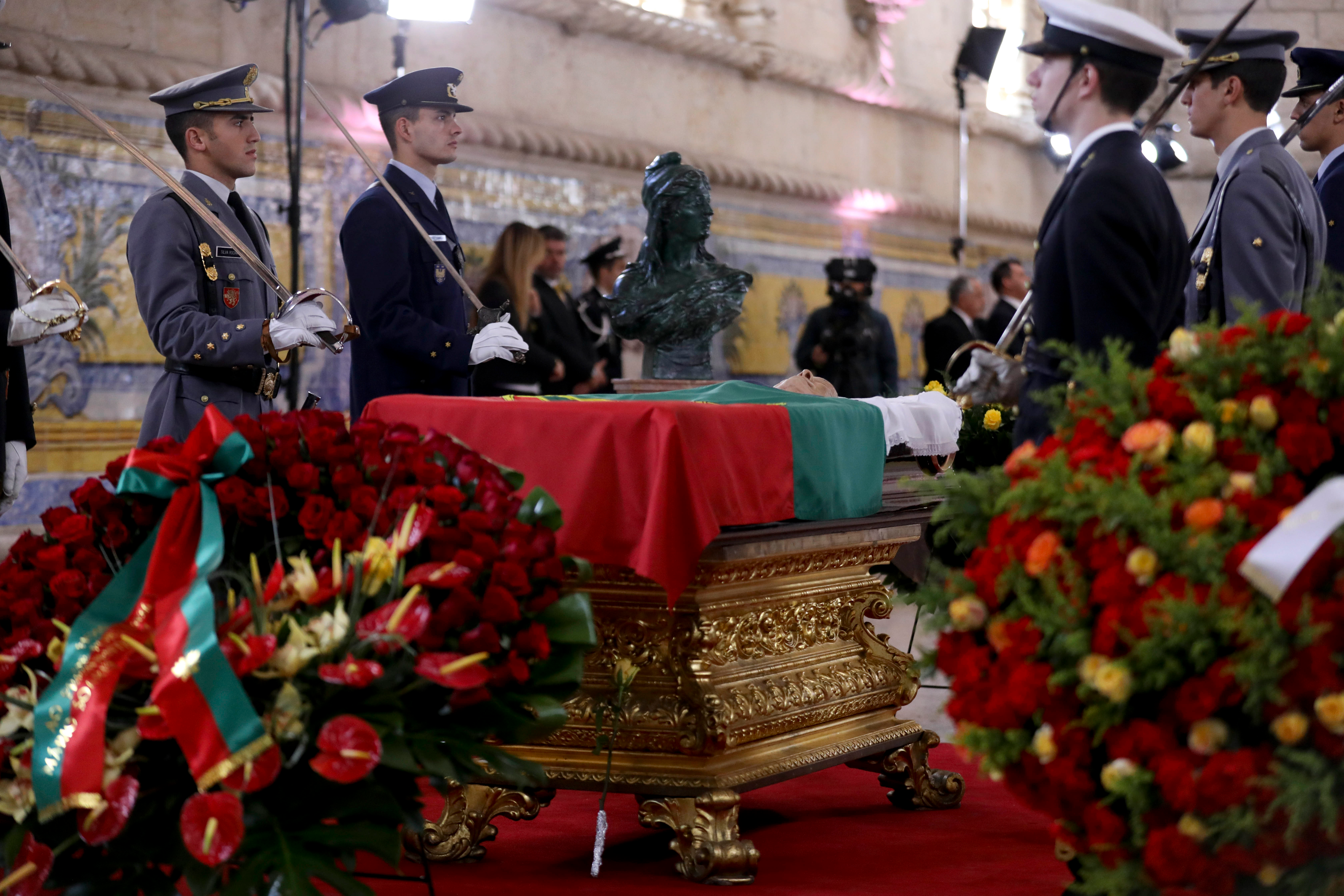
Mário Soares lying-in-state in Jerónimos Monastery, Lisbon, 10 January 2017

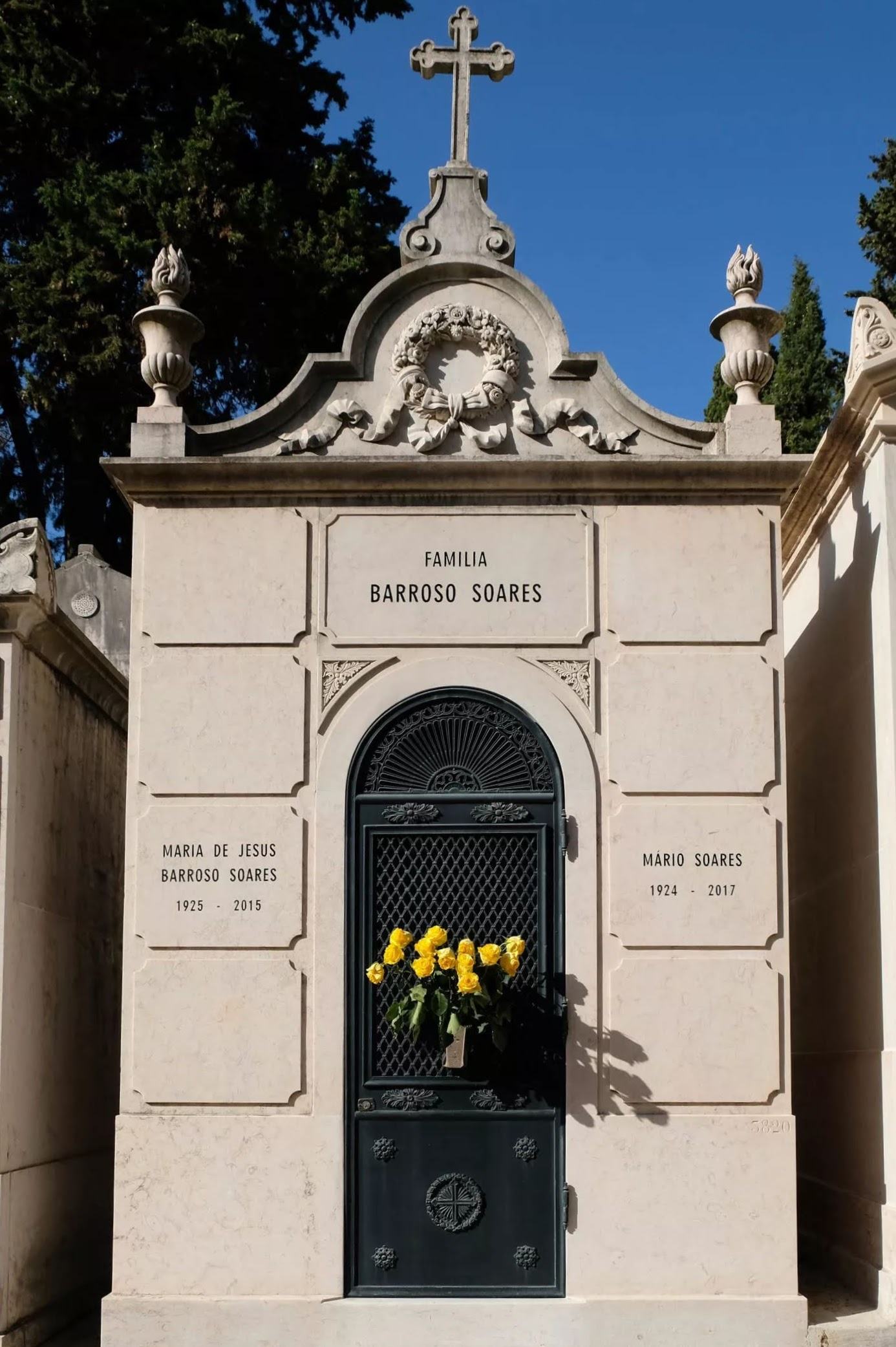
Tomb of Mário Soares, and his wife Maria Barroso, at Prazeres Cemetery, Lisbon.

Soares died on 7 January 2017 at the age of 92. He had been admitted to the hospital on 13 December, and although his condition at first showed slight signs of improvement, he lapsed into a coma on 26 December from which he never recovered. The Portuguese Government offered a state funeral and declared three days of national mourning. It was the first state funeral in Portugal after that of President Óscar Carmona in 1951. After lying in state at Jerónimos Monastery during 9 January, his remains were transported to Prazeres Cemetery the next day, and now lie at the family vault next to those of his wife.

== Honours and awards ==
=== National honours ===
N.B. according to "Ordens honoríficas portuguesas – Nacionais com Ordens Portuguesas" recipients:

- Grand Collar of the Order of the Tower and Sword (GColTE – 9 March 1991)
- Grand Cross of the Order of Christ (GCC – 09/04/1981)
- Grand Collar of the Order of Liberty (GColL – 9 March 1996)
- Grand Master of the Portuguese Orders (9 March 1986 – 9 March 1996):

=== Foreign honours ===
N.B. according to "Ordens honoríficas portuguesas – Nacionais com Ordens Estrangeiras" recipients:

- Algeria: Collar (Athir) of the National Order of Merit (29 May 2005)
- Austria: Grand Star of the Decoration of Honour for Services to the Republic of Austria (10 March 1987)
- Brazil:
  - Grand Collar of the Order of the Southern Cross (10 November 1987)
  - Grand Collar of the Order of the National Congress (13 April 1987)
  - Grand Cross of the Order of the Southern Cross (10 March 1987)
  - Grand Cross of the National Order of Merit (30 March 1988)
  - Grand Cross of the Order of Rio Branco (4 January 1977)

- Bahia: Collar of the Order of Merit of Bahia (30 March 1988)
- São Paulo: Grand Cross of the Order of Ipiranga (13 April 1987)

- Bulgaria: First Class of the Order of the Balkan Mountains (26 October 1994)
- Cape Verde: 1st Class of the Amílcar Cabral Order (5 January 2001)
- Chile: Collar of the Order of Merit (22 July 1992)
- Colombia: Grand Collar of the Order of Boyaca (27 July 1988)
- People's Republic of the Congo: Grand Cross of the Order of Merit of the People's Republic of the Congo (12 September 1989)
- Cyprus: Grand Collar of the Order of Makarios III (29 May 1990)
- Denmark:
  - Knight of the Order of the Elephant (6 May 1992)
  - Grand Cross of the Order of the Dannebrog (30 March 1988)
- Dominican Republic: Grand Cross of the Order of Merit of Duarte, Sánchez and Mella (10 March 1987)
- East Timor: Grand Collar of the Order of Timor-Leste (3 January 2017)
- Ecuador: Collar of the National Order of Merit (12 September 1989)
- Egypt: Collar of the Order of the Nile (4 April 1992)
- Finland: Grand Cross with Collar of the Order of the White Rose of Finland (8 March 1991)
- France:
  - Grand Cross of the National Order of Legion of Honour (7 May 1990)
  - Grand Cross of the National Order of Merit (26 May 1988)
- Germany:
  - Grand Cross Special Class of the Order of Merit of the Federal Republic of Germany (8 January 1991)
  - Grand Cross of the Order of Merit of the Federal Republic of Germany (10 March 1987)
- Greece: Grand Cross of the Order of the Redeemer (20 November 1987)
- Holy See: Collar of the Order of Pope Pius IX (8 January 1991)
- Hungary: Grand Cross of the Order of Merit of the Republic of Hungary (25 January 1993)
- Iceland:
  - Grand Cross with Collar of the Order of the Falcon (4 June 1993)
  - Grand Cross of the Order of the Falcon (21 November 1983)
- Italy:
  - Knight Grand Cross with Collar of the Order of Merit of the Italian Republic (5 April 1989)
  - Knight Grand Cross of the Order of Merit of the Italian Republic (26 April 1986)
- Ivory Coast: Grand Cross of the National Order of the Ivory Coast (1 June 1990)
- Luxembourg:
  - Knight of the Order of the Gold Lion of the House of Nassau (26 May 1988)
  - Grand Cross of the Order of the Oak Crown (28 February 1996)
- Malta: Honorary Companion of Honour of the National Order of Merit (9 October 1994)
- Mexico: Grand Cross of the Order of the Aztec Eagle (16 January 2003)
- Morocco:
  - Collar of the Order of Muhammad (20 February 1995)
  - First Class of the Order of Muhammad (6 February 1992)
- Netherlands: Knight Grand Cross of the Order of the Netherlands Lion (26 September 1991)
- Norway: Grand Cross of the Order of St. Olav (10 March 1987)
- Palestine: Grand Cordon of the Order of the Star of Palestine (18 November 1993)
- Paraguay: Presidential Collar of Marshal López (Grand Cross) of the National Order of Merit (18 December 1995)
- Poland:
  - Grand Cross of the Order of Merit of the Republic of Poland (21 May 1993)
  - Grand Cross of the Order of Polonia Restituta (26 October 1994)
  - Grand Cross of the Order of St Mary Magdalene (19 August 1993)
- Senegal: Grand Cross of the Order of Merit of the Republic of Senegal (28 February 1996)
- South Korea: Grand Gwanghwa Medal of the Order of Diplomatic Service Merit (23 April 1987)
- South Africa: Grand Cross of the Order of Good Hope (17 November 1995)
- Sovereign Military Order of Malta: Collar of the Order pro merito Melitensi (9 May 1989)
- Spain:
  - Collar of the Order of Charles III (30 March 1988)
  - Knight Grand Cross of the Order of Charles III (10 March 1987)
  - Knight Grand Cross of the Order of Isabella the Catholic (21 November 1977)
- Sweden: Knight of the Order of the Seraphim (28 January 1987)
- Tunisia: Grand Cross of the Order of 7 November (6 December 1993)
- United Kingdom:
  - Honorary Knight Grand Cross of the Most Honourable Order of the Bath (19 May 1994)
  - Honorary Knight Grand Cross of the Most Distinguished Order of St Michael and St George (28 February 1996)
- Venezuela: Collar of the Order of the Liberator (10 November 1987)
- Yugoslavia:
  - Great Star of the Order of the Yugoslav Star (23 April 1990)
  - Sash of the Order of the Yugoslav Star (30 March 1988)
- Zaire: Grand Cordon of the National Order of the Leopard (4 December 1989)

=== Foreign awards ===
In 1998, Soares won the International Simón Bolívar Prize of UNESCO.

In 2000, Soares received the North-South Prize of the Council of Europe.

He was an honorary member of the Club of Rome and member of High Council of Francophonie.

He was appointed Doctor of Laws (honoris causa) by the University of Leicester in 1994.

Soares was named the "patron" for the College of Europe's academic year 2020-2021.

== Electoral history ==
=== Legislative election, 1969 ===
Ballot: 26 October 1969
Party	Candidate	Votes	%	Seats	+/−
UN	Marcelo Caetano	981,263	88.0	130	±0
CDE	Francisco Pereira de Moura	114,745	10.3	0	new
CEUD	Mário Soares	16,863	1.5	0	new
CEM	Henrique Barrilaro Ruas	1,324	0.1	0	new
Blank/Invalid ballots		1,053	–	–	–
Turnout		1,115,248	62.50	150	±0
Source: Legislativas 1969

=== Constituent Assembly, 1975 ===
Ballot: 25 April 1975
Party	Candidate	Votes	%	Seats
PS	Mário Soares	2,162,972	37.9	116
PPD	Francisco Sá Carneiro	1,507,282	26.4	81
PCP	Álvaro Cunhal	711,935	12.5	30
CDS	Diogo Freitas do Amaral	434,879	7.6	16
MDP/CDE	Francisco Pereira de Moura	236,318	4.1	5
FSP	Manuel Serra	66,307	1.2	0
MES	Afonso de Barros	58,248	1.0	0
Other parties		137,213	2.4	2
Blank/Invalid ballots		396,675	7.0	–
Turnout		5,711,829	91.66	250
Source: Comissão Nacional de Eleições

=== Legislative election, 1976 ===
Ballot: 25 April 1976
Party	Candidate	Votes	%	Seats	+/−
PS	Mário Soares	1,912,921	34.9	107	–9
PPD	Francisco Sá Carneiro	1,335,381	24.4	73	–8
CDS	Diogo Freitas do Amaral	876,007	16.0	42	+26
PCP	Álvaro Cunhal	788,830	14.4	40	+10
UDP	Mário Tomé	91,690	1.7	1	±0
Other parties		220,936	4.0	0	±0
Blank/Invalid ballots		257,696	2.7	–	–
Turnout		5,483,461	83.53	263	+13
Source: Comissão Nacional de Eleições

=== Legislative election, 1979 ===
Ballot: 2 December 1979
Party	Candidate	Votes	%	Seats	+/−
AD	Francisco Sá Carneiro	2,719,208	45.3	128	+13
PS	Mário Soares	1,642,136	27.3	74	–33
APU	Álvaro Cunhal	1,129,322	18.8	47	+7
UDP	Mário Tomé	130,842	2.2	1	±0
PDC	José Sanches Osório	72,514	1.2	0	±0
Other parties		149,717	2.5	0	±0
Blank/Invalid ballots		163,714	2.7	–	–
Turnout		6,007,453	82.86	250	–13
Source: Comissão Nacional de Eleições

=== Legislative election, 1980 ===
Ballot: 5 October 1980
Party	Candidate	Votes	%	Seats	+/−
AD	Francisco Sá Carneiro	2,868,076	47.6	134	+6
PS	Mário Soares	1,673,279	27.8	74	±0
APU	Álvaro Cunhal	1,009,505	16.8	41	–6
UDP	Mário Tomé	83,204	1.4	1	±0
POUS	Carmelinda Pereira	83,095	1.4	0	±0
PSR	–	60,496	1.0	0	±0
Other parties		111,078	1.8	0	±0
Blank/Invalid ballots		137,692	2.3	–	–
Turnout		6,026,395	83.94	250	±0
Source: Comissão Nacional de Eleições

=== Legislative election, 1983 ===
Ballot: 25 April 1983
Party	Candidate	Votes	%	Seats	+/−
PS	Mário Soares	2,061,309	36.1	101	+35
PSD	Carlos Mota Pinto	1,554,804	27.2	75	–7
APU	Álvaro Cunhal	1,031,609	18.1	44	+3
CDS	Lucas Pires	716,705	12.6	30	–16
Other parties		196,498	3.4	0	±0
Blank/Invalid ballots		146,770	2.6	–	–
Turnout		5,707,695	77.79	263	±0
Source: Comissão Nacional de Eleições

=== Presidential election, 1986 ===
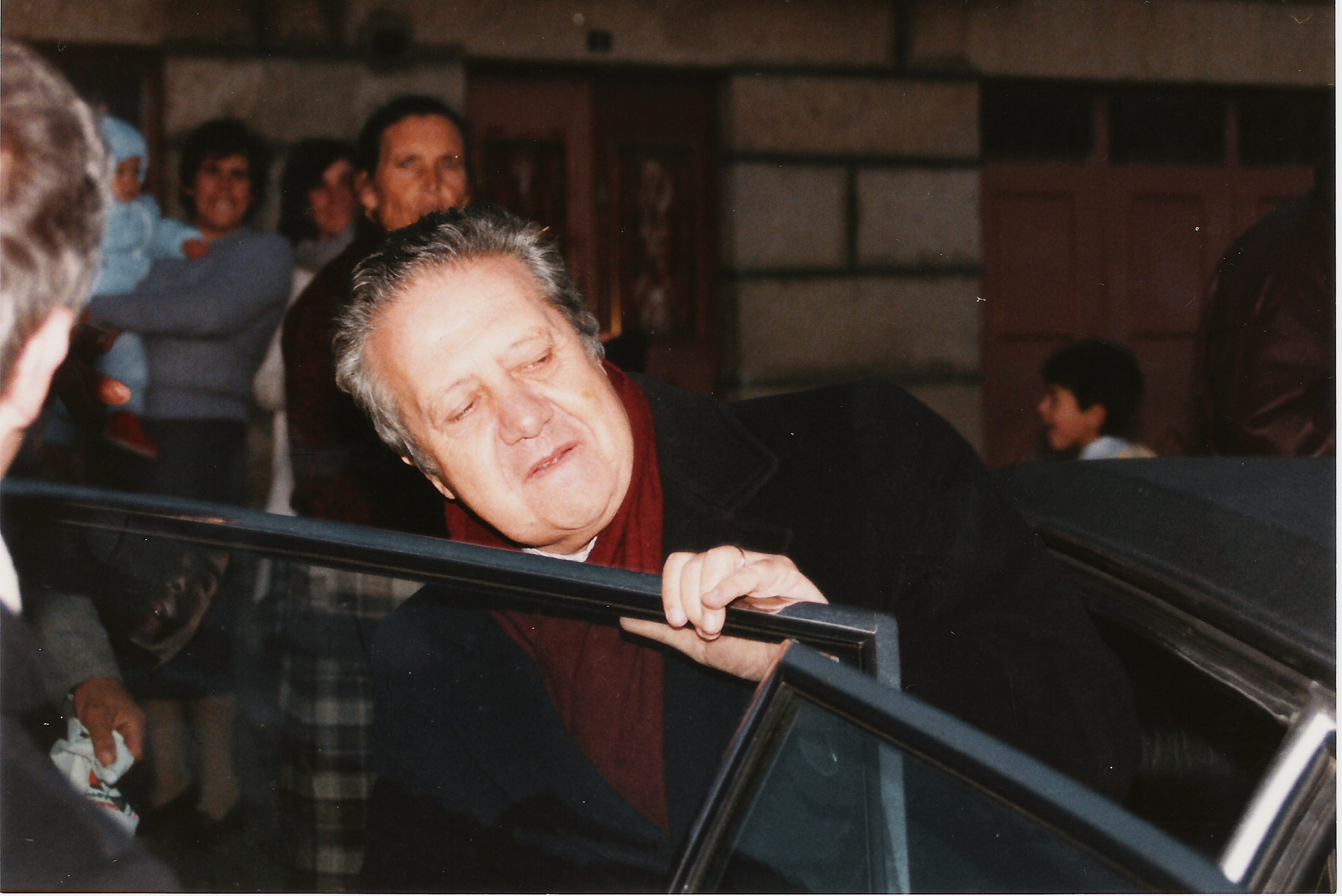
Mário Soares during the campaign for the 1986 presidential election, in a village in Northern Portugal

Ballot: 26 January and 16 February 1986
Candidate	First round		Second round	
Candidate	Votes	%	Votes	%
Mário Soares	1,443,683	25.4	3,010,756	51.2
Diogo Freitas do Amaral	2,629,597	46.3	2,872,064	48.8
Francisco Salgado Zenha	1,185,867	20.9		
Maria de Lourdes Pintasilgo	418,961	7.4		
Blank/Invalid ballots	64,626	–	54,280	–
Turnout	5,742,734	75.39	5,937,100	77.99
Source: Comissão Nacional de Eleições

=== Presidential election, 1991 ===
Ballot: 13 January 1991
Candidate	Votes	%
Mário Soares	3,459,521	70.4
Basílio Horta	696,379	14.2
Carlos Carvalhas	635,373	12.9
Carlos Manuel Marques	126,581	2.6
Blank/Invalid ballots	180,214	–
Turnout	5,098,768	62.16
Source: Comissão Nacional de Eleições

=== European Parliament election, 1999 ===
Ballot: 13 June 1999
Party	Candidate	Votes	%	Seats	+/−
PS	Mário Soares	1,493,146	43.1	12	+2
PSD	Pacheco Pereira	1,078,528	31.1	9	±0
CDU	Ilda Figueiredo	357,671	10.3	2	–1
CDS–PP	Paulo Portas	283,067	8.2	2	–1
BE	Miguel Portas	61,920	1.8	0	new
Other parties		79,619	2.3	0	±0
Blank/Invalid ballots		113,134	3.3	–	–
Turnout		3,467,085	39.93	25	±0
Source: Comissão Nacional de Eleições

=== President of the European Parliament election, 1999 ===
Ballot: 20 July 1999
Party	Candidate	Votes	%
EPP	Nicole Fontaine	306	60.5
PES	Mário Soares	200	39.5
Turnout		506	
Source: Resultados

=== Presidential election, 2006 ===
Ballot: 22 January 2006
Candidate	Votes	%
Aníbal Cavaco Silva	2,773,431	50.5
Manuel Alegre	1,138,297	20.7
Mário Soares	785,355	14.3
Jerónimo de Sousa	474,083	8.6
Francisco Louçã	292,198	5.3
Garcia Pereira	23,983	0.4
Blank/Invalid ballots	102,785	–
Turnout	5,590,132	61.53
Source: Comissão Nacional de Eleições

Assembly of the Republic
None, Parliament re-established	Member of the Assembly of the Republic for Lisbon; 1975–1986	Title jointly held
European Parliament
Title jointly held	Member of the European Parliament from Portugal; 1999–2004	Title jointly held
Party political offices
None, Party established	Secretary-General of the Socialist Party; 1973–1985	Succeeded by Vítor Constâncio
Political offices
Preceded by Vítor Alves; Ernesto Melo Antunes; Álvaro Cunhal; Joaquim Magalhães Mota	Minister without Portfolio; 1975	Succeeded by Jorge Campinos
Preceded by National Salvation Junta; José Medeiros Ferreira	Minister of Foreign Affairs; 1974–1975; 1977–1978	Succeeded by Ernesto Melo Antunes; Vítor de Sá Machado
Preceded by Francisco Sá Carneiro	Leader of the Opposition; 1980–1983	Succeeded by Álvaro Cunhal
Preceded by José Pinheiro de Azevedo; Francisco Pinto Balsemão	Prime Minister of Portugal; 1976–1978; 1983–1985	Succeeded by Alfredo Nobre da Costa; Aníbal Cavaco Silva
Preceded by António Ramalho Eanes	President of Portugal; 1986–1996	Succeeded by Jorge Sampaio
