= Mário Soares and Maria Barroso Foundation =

Portuguese philanthropic organization

The Mário Soares and Maria Barroso Foundation is a private right and public utility institution whose main goal is to promote and organize cultural, scientific and educational events on human rights, democracy, political science and international relations.

The foundation was launched on 12 September 1991 by Portuguese President Mário Soares, who was then serving his second and final term as president. It's headquarters are located in Lisbon, next to São Bento Palace. Firstly named Mário Soares Foundation, it added Maria Barroso's name to the designation in 2020.

Following Mário Soares' death in 2017, the foundation has been led by his daughter, Isabel Soares.

== Works ==
The Mário Soares and Maria Barroso Foundation holds one of the most important archives in Portugal, constituted by several personal archives (such as the archives of Mário Soares and Amílcar Cabral), newspaper archives (O Jornal and Diário de Lisboa, for example) and political organizations' archives (including the Socialist Party's archive).

It also owns the João Lopes Soares Museum-residence, in Cortes, Leiria, which holds a permanent exposition about 20th century Portuguese History.
