= Boria (theatre) =

- Native name: Boria
- Origin: Malaysia

Boria
- Stylistic origins: Music of Malaysia
- Cultural origins: Malaysia

Boria (Jawi: بوريا) is a form of Malay theatre of Indian origin which has through adaptive processes, become the one and only theatre of Malay community in Penang, Malaysia

== History ==
Records on the origin of Boria are fairly limited but it was first mentioned by H.T. Haughton in 1897 which according to him, it was first brought to Penang in 1845 by the Muslim soldiers of 21st Madras Regiment. It was originally played to celebrate the annual Shiite festival, the Mourning of Muharram. In 1910, R.J Wilkinson, a Straits Civil Service officer and a noted scholar of Malay studies, made a comparison between the boria of Madras and Penang, and established that the resemblance was only in name, for the show as then known in Penang had evolved to a totally different form.

== The performance ==
A typical Boria troupe consists of a leader, a chorus, comedians and musicians. The performance normally begins with a short comic sketches and followed by a song-dance routine featuring a juxtaposition of choral and solo parts. The song-dance routine commonly performed in a western music style and with dance forms such as rumbas, cha-cha-cha or soul.

Boria's theme varies from Arab warriors, European traders to Chinese shopkeepers around which the costumes and comic improvisations revolved. The main melodic instruments has consistently violin but various Western, Malay, or Indian drums and Chinese cymbals are also used in the performance.
