= Music of Malaysia =

Music of Malaysia is the generic term for music that has been created in various genres in Malaysia. A great variety of genres in Malaysian music reflects the specific cultural groups within multiethnic Malaysian society: Malay, Javanese and other cultures in overlap with the neighbouring Indonesian archipelago, Arabic, Chinese, Indian, Dayak, Kadazan-Dusun, Bajau, Orang Asli, Melanau, Kristang and others.

In general, music of Malaysia may be categorised as classical, folk, syncretic (or acculturated music), popular and contemporary art music. Classical and folk music emerged during the pre-colonial period and exists in the form of vocal, dance and theatrical music such as Nobat, Mak Yong, Mak Inang, Dikir barat, Ulek mayang and Menora. The syncretic music developed during the post-Portuguese period (17th century) and contains elements from both local music and foreign elements of Arabian, Persian, Indian, Chinese and Western musical and theatrical sources. Among genres of this music are Zapin, Ghazal, Mata-kantiga, Joget, Jikey, Boria and Bangsawan.

Both Malaysian popular music and contemporary art music are essentially Western-based music combined with some local elements. In 1950s, the musician P. Ramlee helped in creating a Malaysian music that combined folks songs with Western dance rhythms and western Asian music.

== Ethnic traditions ==
Besides Malay music, Chinese and Indian Malaysians have their own forms of music, and the indigenous tribes of Peninsular and East Malaysia have unique traditional instruments.

=== Malay music ===
Traditional Malay music spans from music for various theatrical forms such as wayang kulit, bangsawan and dance dramas as well as story-telling, to folk songs and music for dances, royal ceremonies, martial arts (silat), life cycle events, and religious occasions. Many forms of traditional Malay music and performing arts appear to have originated in the Kelantan-Pattani region with influence from India, China, Thailand and Indonesia. The music is based around percussion instruments, the most important of which is the gendang (drum). There are at least 14 types of traditional drums, including kompang and hadrah drums. Drums and other traditional percussion instruments are often made from natural materials. Besides drums, other percussion instruments (some made of shells) include the rebab (a bowed string instrument), the serunai (a double-reed oboe-like instrument), the seruling (flute), and trumpets (nafiri). Music is traditionally used for storytelling, celebrating life-cycle events, and times like rice harvests. It was once used as a form of long-distance communication.

All of Peninsular Malaysia's surviving state monarchies have their own court music or nobat, such music is still performed at formal royal events in Kuala Lumpur's Istana Negara (and Brunei's Lapau).

In East Malaysia, gong-based musical ensemble such as agung and kulintang are commonly used in ceremonies such as funerals and weddings. These ensembles are also common in neighbouring regions such as in the southern Philippines, Kalimantan in Indonesia and Brunei.

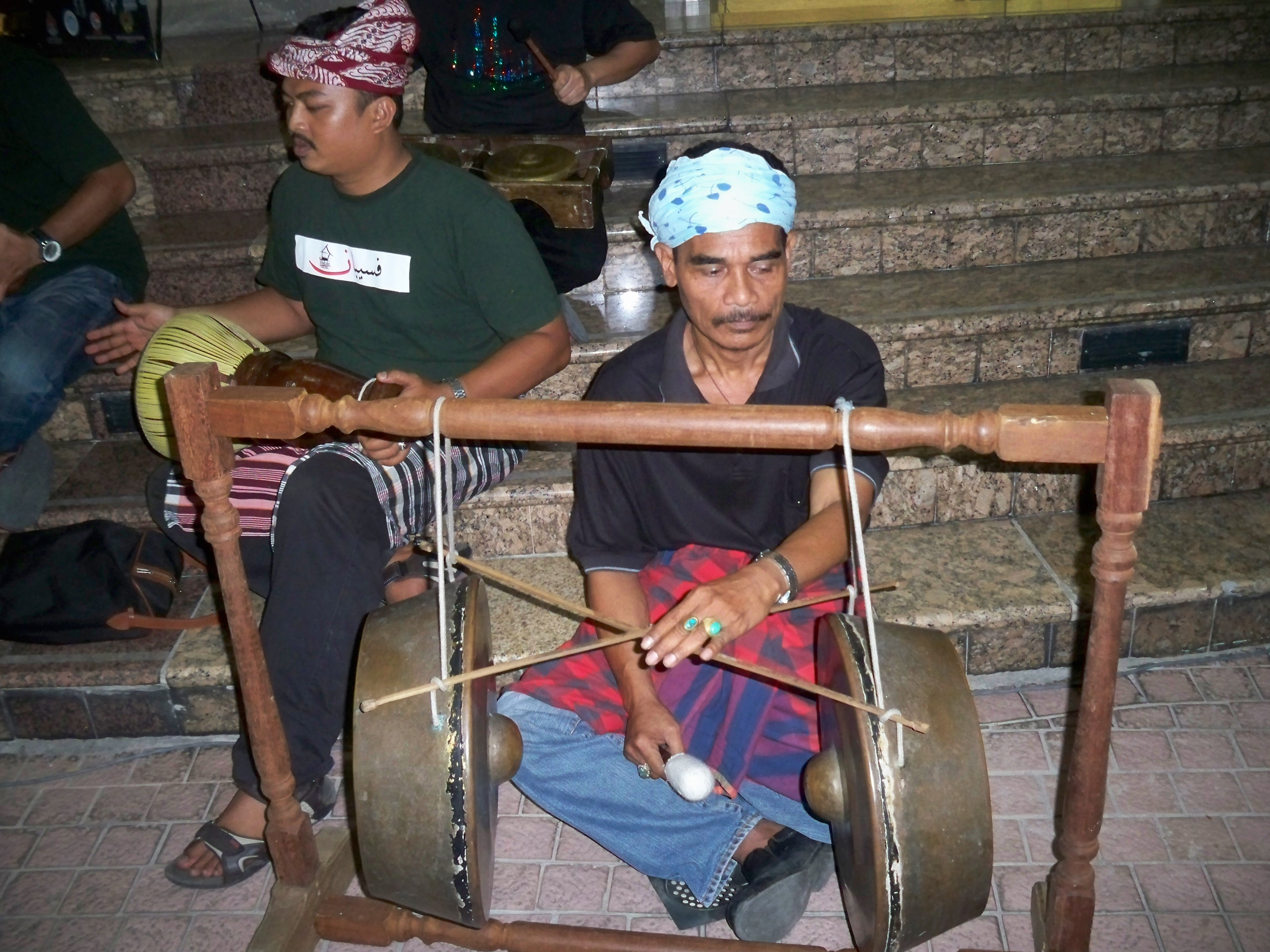
Malays playing gongs

The Malays of Kelantan and Terengganu are culturally linked to peoples from the South China Sea coastal areas, and are quite different from Peninsula West Coast Malays. The martial art of silat Melayu developed in the Malay Peninsula since the beginning of the common era also popular in Malaysia, while essentially still important as a branch of the self-defence form. Similar to tai chi, though of independent origin, it is a mix of martial arts, dance and music typically accompanied by gongs, drums and Indian oboes like the sornay and nafir.

The natives of the Malay Peninsula played in small ensembles called kertok, which perform swift and rhythmic xylophone music; this may have partly led to the development of dikir barat. In recent years, the Malaysian government has promoted this Kelantanese music form as a national cultural icon.

Johorean art performances such as zapin and hamdolok as well as musical instruments including gambus and samrah have apparent Arab and Persian influences. Arabic-derived zapin music and dance is popular throughout Malaysia, and is usually accompanied by a gambus and some drums. Ghazals from the Indian subcontinent are popular in the markets and malls of Kuala Lumpur and Johor, and stars like Kamariah Noor are very successful. In Malacca, ronggeng is the dominant form of folk music played with a violin, drums, guitar, bass, synthesizer, button accordion and a gong instrument. Another style, dondang sayang is slow and intense; it mixes influences from China, India, Arabia, and Portugal with traditional elements.

=== Chinese music ===
The Hua Yue Tuan (华乐团), or "Chinese orchestra," is made up of traditional Chinese musical instruments and some Western instruments. The music itself combines western polyphony with Chinese melodies and scales. Although the bulk of its repertoire consists of music originated from Hong Kong, Taiwan and China, many local Chinese orchestras also regularly perform Malay folk tunes with various local composers making a definite effort to absorb elements of surrounding musical cultures, especially Malay, into their compositions. In Malaysia, Chinese orchestras exist nationwide in urban areas which have large concentrations of Chinese Malaysians. Sponsored largely by various Chinese organisations including schools, clan associations and Buddhist societies, a typical orchestra consists of between 12 and 50 members. The orchestra is usually made up of four sections: bowed string instruments, plucked strings, the wind section, and percussion. Also commonly found are percussion troupes with drums, gongs and cymbals that provide rhythm for performances of Lion Dance.

There is no lack of virtuoso performers in the Chinese classical tradition in Malaysia. Advanced training is however not presently available with most Malaysian virtuoso musicians obtaining their advanced training either in China or Singapore. Various professional and semi-professional Chinese orchestras are in existence. Malaysian western trained classical conductors are employed full-time. Much of the music played is imported from China. There are however some accomplished Malaysian composers for this medium such as Saw Boon Kiat and Chew Hee Chiat.

There has been a local Malaysian Chinese recording industries since the 1960s with generations of Chinese singers involved in Mandopop music. In the 1960s singers such as Poon Sow Keng (潘秀瓊) achieved notable success in the region, and in the 1970s and 80s, Malaysian Chinese pop singers such as Wong Shiau Chuen, Lan Yin, Donny Yap, and Lee Yee were popular. In more recent times, popular singers include Eric Moo, Lee Sin Je, Fish Leong, Z Chen, Penny Tai and Daniel Lee.

=== Indian music ===
Traditional Indian music may be associated with religious tradition and faith. As its origins in India, there are two systems of traditional or classical Indian music in Malaysia: Carnatic music and Hindustani music. Since Tamils from South India are the predominant group among the Indian population in Malaysia, it is the South Indian Carnatic music which predominates. Simply speaking, Hindustani classical music is more lyric-oriented, while Carnatic classical music emphasises musical structure.

Indian classical music as it is performed in Malaysia has remained true to its origin. There is practically no other cultural influence. Other than reflecting Indian life, the purpose of Indian classical music is to refine the soul.

The fundamental elements of Carnatic music are the raga and the tala. A raga is a scale of notes, while the tala is the time-measure. A Carnatic music concert usually starts with a composition with lyrical and passages in a particular raga. This will be followed by a few major and subsequently some minor compositions.

In Malaysia, traditional and classical Indian music are studied and performed by Malaysians of Indian ethnic origin with material that still comes from India. Musical productions are mainly in the form of dance dramas incorporating instrumental ensemble, vocal music and dance. Musical instruments used in the performances are imported from India.

Over the years, Punjabi music has established itself in Malaysia. One example of famous Punjabi music is bhangra. Many Malaysian songs today have the Punjabi influence. For example, the sound of the dhol, an instrument used mainly by the Punjabis, has been incorporated in many Malay, Chinese and Indian songs in Malaysia.

=== Indigenous tribal music ===
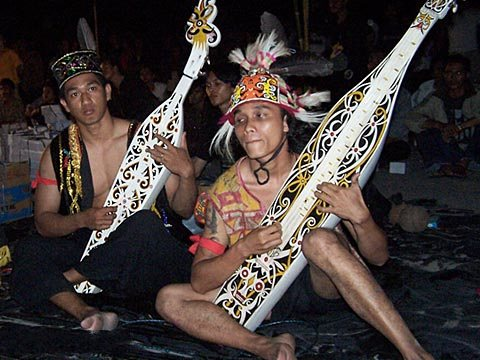
Two Dayak tribesmen playing Sapeh in Sarawak

The Orang Asli groups of West Malaysia, Semang, Senoi, and Orang Melayu Asli, have their own musical traditions. The Semang people are nomadic and their musical instruments are disposable and created when needed, and instruments used include nose flute (salet, nabad), Jew's harp and tube zither (kərɑtuŋ) which are also used by the Senoi. Instruments used by the Senoi are more long-lasting and include kərəb (a two-string chordophone). The Orang Melayu Asli however have closer contact with Malay and Chinese populations and used a wider range of musical instruments ranging from thigh xylophone (kongkong) to violin. The instruments may be used for shamanistic purposes such as singing and trance-dancing ceremonies, and healing rituals.

Music in Sabah and Sarawak—a number of indigenous Dayak and other ethnic groups such as the Bajau, Bidayuh, Dusun, Iban, Kadazan, Kajan, Kayan, and Murut—is percussion-oriented. They have a musical heritage consisting of various types of agung and kulintangan ensembles—percussion ensembles composed of large hanging, suspended or held, bossed/knobbed gongs which act as drums without any accompanying melodic instrument. The music of these people include vocal music for epics and narratives; songs for life-cycle events and rituals associated with religion, healing, growing rice, hunting game, and waging war; songs for dancing and community entertainment; as well as a wide variety of instrumental music. Instruments used include drums, gongs, flutes, zithers, xylophones, and Jew's harps, of which the bronze gongs are the most significant. Ensembles of gongs of various sizes are played to welcome guests and in ceremonies and dances. A well-known instrument in Sarawak is the sapeh, a plucked lute of the Kayan and Kenyah people which is used for entertainment and dancing. Other instruments include the xylophone jatung utang, bamboo flutes (suling, seruling, kesuling, ensuling, and nabat), and sets of bamboo tubes called togunggak which were formerly played in headhunting ceremonies of the Murut.

=== World music ===
Ethnic music has also found a new and vigorous following, with world music festivals like the Rainforest World Music Festival, held annually since 1998 in a scenic open-air setting in Sarawak. The first Malaysian "ethnic fusion" group to play on this international platform was Akar Umbi - comprising Temuan ceremonial singer Minah Angong (1930–1999), Antares and Rafique Rashid. Unfortunately, the charismatic Minah Angong (better known as Mak Minah) died just three weeks after winning over the hearts of a whole new audience at the RWMF 1999. This left Akar Umbi with only one posthumously released CD to its name ('Songs of the Dragon,' Magick River, 2002).

Private companies like Trident Entertainment have begun to invest in the production, distribution and promotion of the "ethnic fringe" in Malaysian music.

== Classical music ==
Within Malaysia, the largest performing arts venue is the Petronas Philharmonic Hall. The resident orchestra is the Malaysian Philharmonic Orchestra (MPO). Malay popular music is a combination of the music from all ethnicities in the country. The Malaysian government has taken steps in controlling what music is available in Malaysia; rap music has been criticised, heavy metal has been limited, and foreign bands must submit a copy of a recent concert before playing in Malaysia. It is believed that this music is a bad influence on youth.

=== Fusion music ===
In the field of Malaysian contemporary music a number of composers have gained international recognition, for example composers Chong Kee Yong, Dr Tazul Izan Tajuddin, Yii Kah Hoe, Saidah Rastam, Adeline Wong and others, encompassing a diverse range of styles and aesthetics.

== Modern music ==
=== Pop ===
Malaysia's pop music scene developed from traditional social dance and entertainment music such as asli, inang, joget, dondang sayang, zapin and masri, which were adapted to Anglo-American dance band arrangement by Bangsawan troupes in the 1920s and 1930s. The Bangsawan troupes are in fact a type of Malaysian opera influenced by Indian opera at first known as Wayang Parsi (Persia) which was started by rich Persians residing in India. They portrayed stories from diverse groups such as Indian, Western, Islamic, Chinese, Indonesian and Malay. Music, dance, and acting with costumes are used in performance depending on the stories told. The musicians were mostly local Malays, Filipinos and Guanis (descendants from Goa in India).

One of the earliest modern Malay pop songs was "Tudung Periok", sung by Momo Latif, who recorded it in 1930. In the 1950s, P. Ramlee became the most popular Malay singer and composer with a range of slow ballads such as "Azizah", "Dendang Perantau" and the evergreen "Di Mana Kan Ku Cari Ganti".

In the 1960s, a genre of pop music influenced by The Beatles and other British rock and roll bands called 'Pop Yeh-yeh' appeared in Malaysia. The term "pop yeh-yeh" was taken from a line from the popular Beatles song, "She Loves You" ("she loves you, yeah-yeah-yeah"). In the 1960s and 1970s, a modified rock combo called kugiran (an abbreviation of "kumpulan gitar rancak", meaning rhythmic guitar bands) was also common, and was often used to accompany singers.

In the mid-1990s, dangdut experienced a resurgence after lying dormant since the early 1980s with the debut of Amelina. Her least successful album sold in the 100,000s, a feat that is yet to be repeated in the 2010s. Composer Ruslan Mamat, who pioneered the modern Dangdut, credited Ace of Base for the tempo reference. The decade also saw a resurgence of interest in traditional music genres like ghazal and inang driven by artists like Siti Nurhaliza and Noraniza Idris with new classically inspired but upbeat songs make major airwave rotation and mainstream spotlight in music shows and awards under the banners of Irama Malaysia ("Malaysian Melodies"), etnik kreatif ("creative ethnic [music]") or pop etnik ("ethnic pop").

Contemporary pop music exchanges between Malaysia, Indonesia, Singapore and Brunei are normal due to the literary form of Malay used in songwriting widely understood in all four countries.

=== Hip Hop ===
KRU is the most successful Hip Hop dance group in Malaysia. After bringing Rap music to the masses in 1992, they established their own record label creating the first Malaysian girl group Feminin and R&B crooners Indigo. Feminin debuted at RTM Eid ul-Fitr special in 1993 marking the start of the 90s girls group era.

SonaOne is a Malaysian rapper with notable songs like "I don't care" and "No More"

=== Rock ===
Malaysian rock reached its peak in the 80s and early 90s with the local adaptation of a fusion of blues rock, hard rock and ballad. The popularity even reached the neighbouring country of Indonesia.

Awie is a Malaysian rock singer and was extremely popular in 1990s.

== See also ==
- Anugerah Industri Muzik
- Anugerah Juara Lagu
- Recording Industry Association of Malaysia
