= Branyo =

Traditional dance of Malaysia

- Native name: Branyo
- Genre: Traditional dance
- Origin: Malaysia

The Branyo is a form of dance from Malaysia traditionally danced by the original Portuguese colonists of Malacca and their present-day descendants in Malaysia. It is a development of the Portuguese folk dance corridinho from the Algarve. Branyo has been an integral part of the Malaccan Portuguese festival of Introdu since the early 16th century. Introdu is known as Shrove Sunday or Quinquagesima to the non-Portuguese speaking world and is the Sunday just before Ash Wednesday which marks the season of Lent. This dance has enriched Malay culture and has influenced the later Malay dance known as the Joget.

There are 4 rhythms in Branyo. They are Jingli Nona, Canji Papa, Che Corte and Sarampeh.

== See also ==
- Music of Malaysia
