= João Lopes Soares =

Portuguese politician (1878–1970)

João Lopes Soares (17 November 1878 – 31 July 1970) was a Portuguese politician who served as Minister of Colonies during the First Portuguese Republic. He was the father of Mário Soares.

== Biography ==
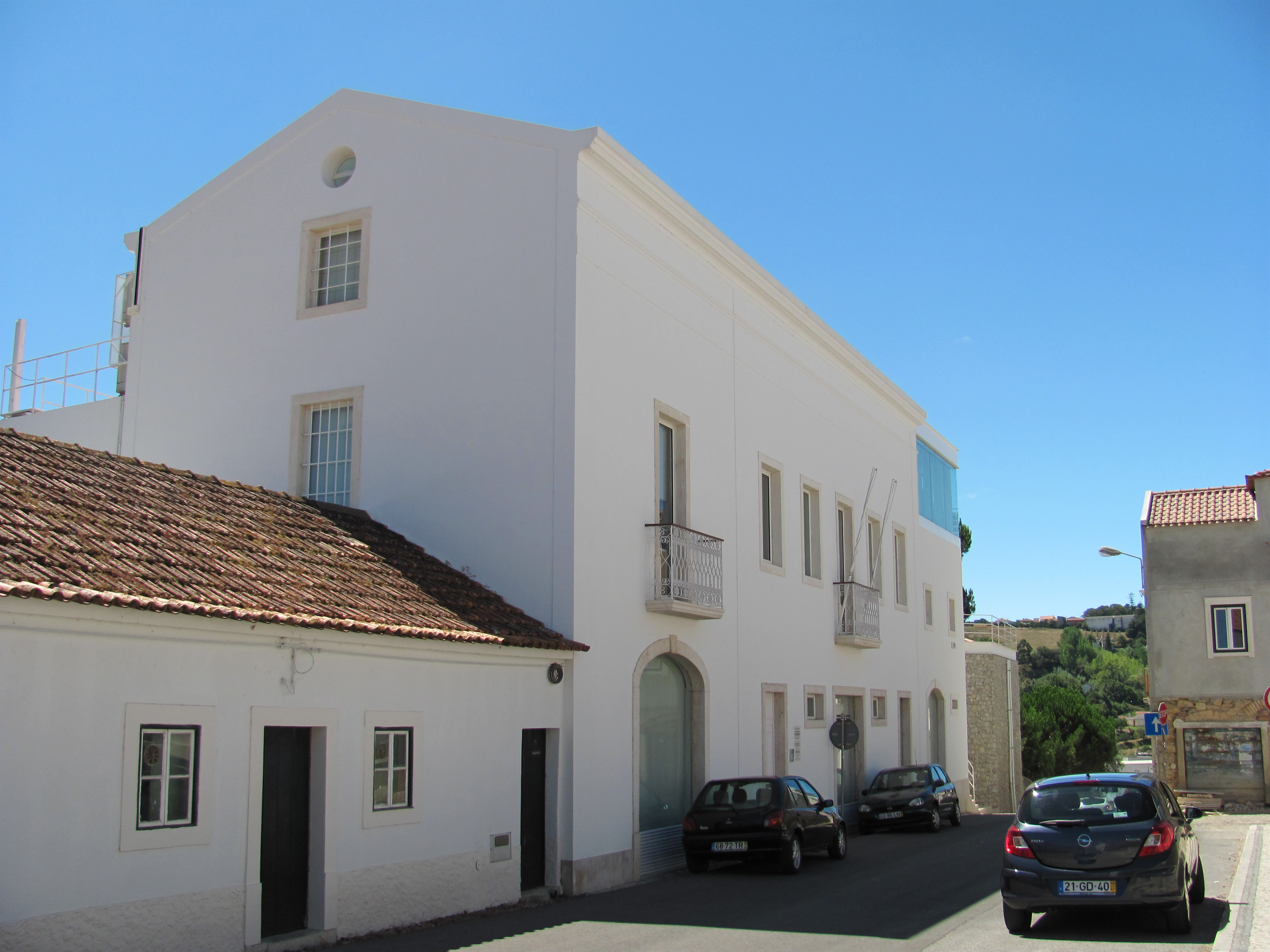
Museum-residence of João Lopes Soares, in Cortes, Leiria

Soares was born in Arrabal, Leiria, in 1878. He studied Theology in the University of Coimbra, becoming a Catholic priest.

As priest, he becomes a military chaplain, eventually becoming closer to Republican ideals, being arrested in 1908 because of this.

After the establishment of the Republic on 5 October 1910, he was appointed as Mayor of Guarda in 1912, later becoming Civil Governor of the same district. In 1913 he became Civil Governor of Braga, and from 1915, of Santarém.

In 1919 he was appointed as Minister of Colonies during the cabinet of Domingos Pereira, which lasted 3 months.

After the 28 May 1926 coup, he fought against the dictatorship, being arrested several times.

He founded the Colégio Moderno in 1936, which would later be ran by his daughter-in-law Maria Barroso and then by his granddaughter Isabel Soares.

He died on 31 July 1970, in Lisbon, at 91 years old.

== Personal life ==
He was the father of Mário Soares, future President and Prime Minister of Portugal.
