= Fernando Maurício =

Portuguese singer and fadista (1933–2003)

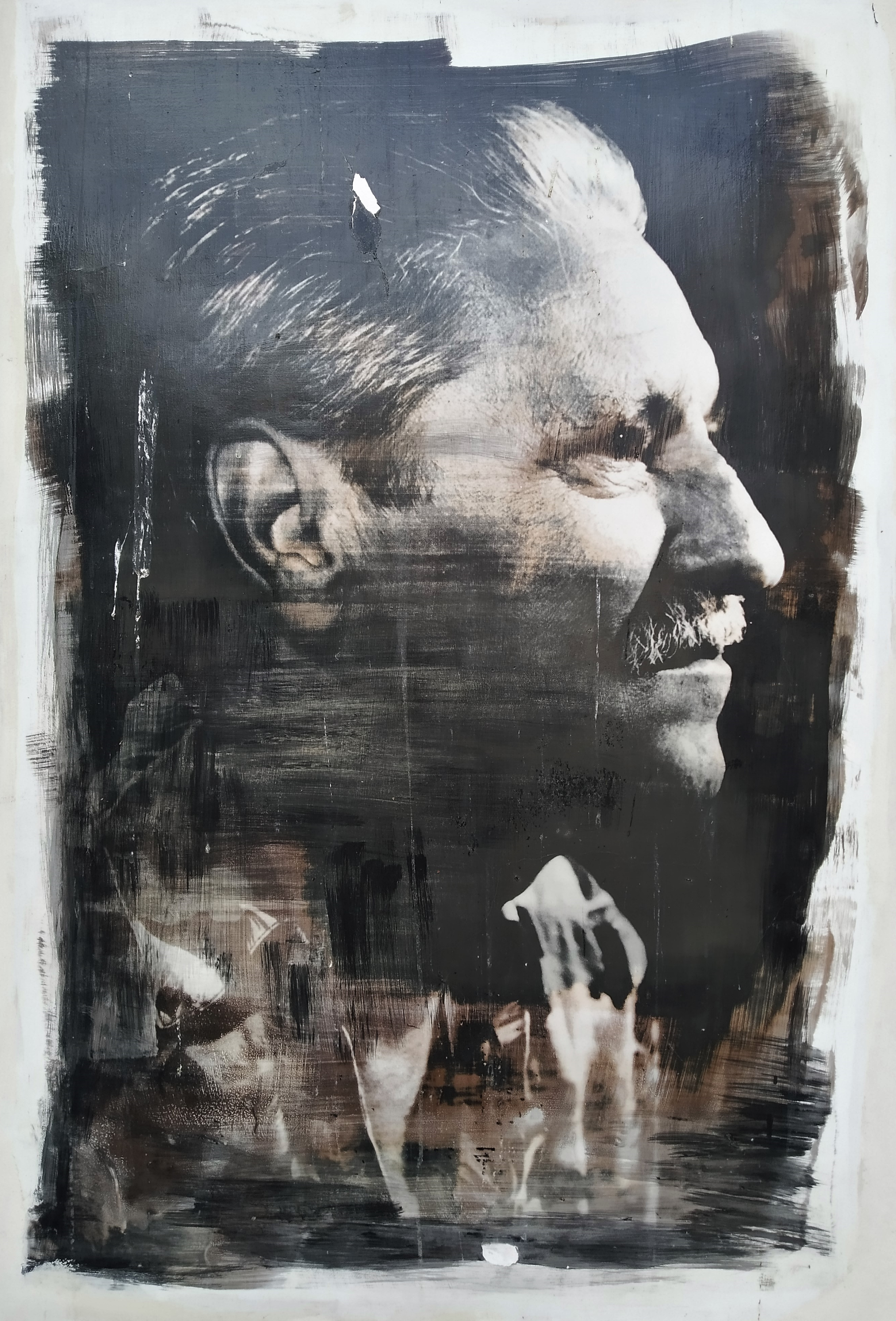

Background information
- Born: November 21, 1933; Mouraria, Lisbon, Portugal
- Died: July 15, 2003 (aged 69); Lisbon, Portugal
- Genres: Fado
- Occupation(s): Singer, fadista
- Instrument: Vocals
- Years active: 1940s–2003

Fernando Maurício (November 21, 1933, Mouraria, Lisbon, Portugal – July 15, 2003, Lisbon, Portugal) was a Portuguese singer and fadista.

At an early age he already showed great skill and needed special permission to sing as a professional at that age. He sang regularly for three years taking a break soon after and returning later to conclude his career.

He helped bringing fado to television in the late 1960s, receiving various awards, one of those given by the Portuguese president.

He died of a heart attack, aged 69, in hospital.
