= Order of St Mary Magdalene =

The Order of St Mary Magdalene (Latin: Ordo Sanctae Mariae Magdalenae de poenitentia or OSMM) is a Roman Catholic religious order for women, named after Mary Magdalene. Its members are known in German as Magdalenerinnen or Büßerinnen or in Latin as Sorores poenitentes (penitential sisters).

== Bibliography (in German) ==
- Paul Skobel: Das Jungfräuliche Klosterstift zur Heiligen Maria Magdalena von der Buße zu Lauban in Schlesien von 1320–1821. Hrsg. und ergänzt bis zur Gegenwart von Edmund Piekorz. Konrad Theiss, Aalen und Stuttgart 1970.
- Kurt Köster: Mainz in der Geschichte des Reuerinnen-Ordens. In: Jahrbuch für das Bistum Mainz, Jg. 3 (1948), S. 243–272.
- Jörg Voigt: Beginen im Spätmittelalter. Frauenfrömmigkeit in Thüringen und im Reich. Böhlau, Köln 2012, ISBN 978-3-412-20668-0 (= Veröffentlichungen der Historischen Kommission für Thüringen, Kleine Reihe, Band 32; Dissertation Uni Jena 2009).
