= Pedro Caldeira Cabral =

Portuguese musician

Pedro da Fonseca Caldeira Cabral (born 4 December 1950 in Lisbon, Portugal) is a Portuguese composer, published author and multi-instrumentalist who specializes in Mediaeval, Renaissance, Baroque and Iberian music. His primary instrument is the Portuguese Guitar. He is the recipient of the Degree of Grand Officer of the Order of Infante D. Henrique, awarded to him in 2018 by the President of the Republic, Marcelo Rebelo de Sousa.

== Education ==
Pedro Caldeira Cabral learned bass guitar and Bisel flute with his sisters. At 10 years old he received an antique guitar, and by age 14, he had begun performing in amateur shows.

In 1967, at the age of 16, he performed as a soloist for the first time on the direct broadcasting programmes of Fado in Rádio Clube Português, accompanied by Fernando Alvim on bass guitar.

As a child, he studied Portuguese and classical guitar as well as the recorder. He went on to study music theory, counterpoint and harmony with Professor Artur Santos of the National Music Conservatory of Lisbon. In 1970 he began studying the lute, viola and other early music string and wind instruments.

== Career ==
Pedro Caldeira Cabral founded and directed the early music groups 'La Batalla' and 'Concerto Atlântico', specializing in the performance of Medieval and Renaissance music on period instruments. As a composer, Cabral's style is rooted in the solo guitar tradition, incorporating techniques and elements gathered from his study of the traditional instruments of the art, and popular forms within the Mediterranean musical heritage. On the Portuguese guitar, he has performed transcriptions of works by J.S.Bach, S.L.Weiss, D.Scarlatti, Seixas, S.de Murcia, R.de Visée, as well as given first performances of original pieces by other contemporary composers.

He has researched in the field of traditional music (musical organology) and collaborated with Dr. Ernesto Veiga de Oliveira on the second and third editions of the book “Portuguese Traditional Musical Instruments”, Calouste Gulbenkian Foundation, Lisbon, 1982 and 2000. He also created the complete inventory and organological classification of Michel Giacometti’s collection in the Music Museum of Cascais. He has composed original music for the theater, cinema, TV series and ballet. Since 1969, toured intensively as a Portuguese guitar player in international music festivals in Europe, Asia and the U.S.

He was responsible for the artistic direction of the International Portuguese Guitar Festival at World Expo 98, held in Lisbon, and performed the work Macau Rhapsody by composer Kwan Nai-Chung with Orquestra Chinesa De Macau. Between 2001 and 2009 he was the artistic director of the Medieval Music Festival of Carrazeda de Ansiães. Portugal. Since 2006 he has produced and directed the Festival “Som das Musas” in Vila Flor, Portugal. In 2007, the first international conference 'Incontros Internationais de Guitarra Portuguesa' at Coimbra was started on his initiative.

His book, “The Portuguese Guitar”, Ediclube, Lisbon 1999, is the first monography on this national instrument’s origins and historical' evolution, iconography, organological study and repertoire. He has appeared in television programs for following networks: RTP (Portugal), WDR, ZDF and NDR (Germany), BBC and Granada TV (UK), ORTF (France), VPRO (Netherlands), TV Globo and TV Cultura de São Paulo (Brazil).

== Discography ==
- 'Guitarras de Portugal', Tecla (1971),
- 'Encontros', Orfeu (1982),
- 'A Guitarra nos Salões do Século XVIII', Orfeu (1983),
- 'Pedro Caldeira Cabral', EMI (1985), 'Duas Faces', EMI (1987),
- 'Guitarra Portuguesa', GHA (1991),
- 'Momentos da Guitarra', Fenn Music (1992),
- 'Variações', World Network/WDR (1993),
- 'Música de Guitarra Inglesa', BMG/RCA Classics (1998),
- 'Memórias da Guitarra Portuguesa' Tradisom, 2003 and Guitarra Diversa, Mastermix, 2004.

== Recent works ==
- As Madeiras e os Sons, in 'As Idades da Madeira', Instituto do Emprego e Formação Profissional, Lisboa, 1997
- A Guitarra Portuguesa, Ediclube, Amadora, 1999
- in Instrumentos Musicais Populares Portugueses, de Ernesto Veiga de Oliveira, Fundação Calouste Gulbenkian, Lisboa, 1982 and 2000.
- The Portuguese Guitar, Caixa Geral de Depósitos, Lisboa, 2000
- A Construção da Viola Campaniça, in 'A Viola Campaniça' de José Alberto Sardinha, Tradisom, Vila Verde, 2001.
- À Descoberta da Guitarra Portuguesa, C. M. Santo Tirso, Museu Abade de Pedrosa, 2002
- A Guitarra Portuguesa, in 'Revista CAIS nº 80', 2003.
- Michel Giacometti, Uma colecção instrumental in 'Michel Giacometti, Caminho para um Museu', C.M. de Cascais, 2004
- Den portugisiska gitarren, in 'Musiken som foddes bortom haven' by Thomas Nydhal, Artea Forlag, Estocolmo, Suécia, 2006
- A Guitarra Portuguesa, in 'As Idades do Som', Instituto do Emprego e Formação Profissional, Lisboa, 2006
- A Viola Popular em Portugal, in 'As Idades do Som', Instituto do Emprego e Formação Profissional', Lisboa, 2006
- Sonhar um Som Português, in 'Sonho português', Egoísta, nº 28, Estoril-Sol, S.A., Lisboa, 2006.

== See also ==
- Portuguese guitar
- Cittern
