= Joget =

Malay dance

Joget dance
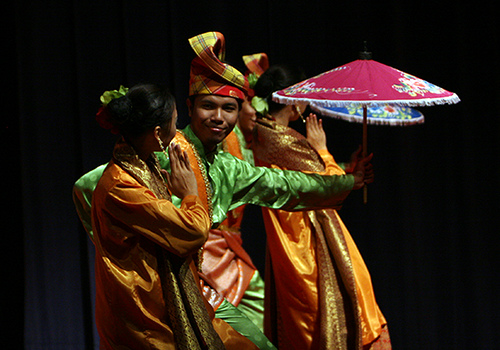
- A Joget performance.
- Native name: Tarian Joget
- Origin: Malaysia

Joget (Jawi: جوڬيت) is a traditional Malay dance that originated in Malacca in the colonial era. It was influenced by the Portuguese dance of Branyo which is believed to have been spread to Malacca during the spice trade. In Malacca, joget dance is better known as Chakunchak. The dance is one of the most popular folk dances in Malaysia that is normally performed by couples in cultural festivals, weddings and other social functions. Joget gained popularity among the Malay community in Singapore after its introduction in 1942.

The dance is of the Portuguese roots and is accompanied by an ensemble consisting of a violin of Western world, a knobbed gong of Asia, a flute (optional), and at least two rebana or gendang of Maritime Southeast Asia. The tempo of Joget music is fairly quick, with a feeling of teasing and playing between the partners. The music emphasizes duple- and triple-beat division, both in alternation and simultaneously, and is sung in the northeast Malaysian style.

One of the most popular types of Joget is called "Joget Lambak" which is usually performed by a large crowd together at social functions. In Indonesia, the term 'joget' is usually applied to any form of popular street dance, such as that to dangdut music. Joget, an open source workflow software built in Malaysia, is named after this dance.

Sri Lankan Kaffiringna music style and Joget has some related melodic variations. Both styles have a Portuguese influence, according to Sri Lankan musicologist Ruwin Dias.
