= Dondang Sayang =

Malaccan love ballads

- Native name: Dondang Sayang
- Origin: Malaysia

Dondang Sayang
- UNESCO Intangible Cultural Heritage
- Country: Malaysia
- Reference: 01410
- Region: Asia and the Pacific

Inscription history
- Inscription: 2018 (13th session)
- List: Representative

Dondang Sayang (literally 'love ballad') originated in Malacca sometime in the 15th century, influenced by traditional Portuguese folk music. It is a traditional Malay form of entertainment where Baba and Nyonya singers exchange extemporaneous Malay Pantun (poetry), in a lighthearted and sometimes humorous style. The singers are normally accompanied by a violin, two Malay rebana (drums), and a tetawak (gong). These instruments are often supplemented by other available instruments, most notably, accordions, flutes, or an additional violin.

The chief musician is usually the violinist who plays a primary role in dondang sayang, providing a counter melody to the vocal melody. Musicians may switch instruments in between performances, but the violinist rarely does, although this is permitted. If there are musicians to spare, up to five rebana may be used. Sometimes, the rebana may be substituted by the tambour and barrel drum or even the kompang. The music is slow, and a song usually consists of 32 bars, beginning with a violin introduction, with the rebana and then the gong entering, and the voice finally entering in bar 5. Its style is somewhat informal and its lyrics usually consist of love poems. (Ahmad Usop 1984). The musical instruments may also be augmented with an accordion (Shafiee Ahmad 1992).

It is also associated with the Ronggeng dance.

Dondang Sayang also serves as the interval signal for the radio stations owned by Radio Televisyen Malaysia in the past. It continued to be used by the Voice of Malaysia up until its closure in 2011.

== See also ==
- Music of Malaysia
- Mata-kantiga
