= Bruneian art =

Bruneian art is art from the country of Brunei. Brunei's art includes paintings, jewelry, and clothing.

== History ==
Art in Brunei was not a focus until the early 1950s, Brunei's government then took a stand to support culture. They created a building for artists to sell their works. In 1984, the art market had grown enough that it had to move to a larger space.

== Artists ==
Dato Paduka Shofry bin Abdul Ghafor is a local artist. His work is displayed at the Rainforest Gallery, which opened March 2014. Dato is a manager and owner of the gallery. One of his works is called Home of Bruneian Art. Behind the art, it describes the painting of everyone's home. The painting is full of purples, burgundy, dark brown, and black.

Another of Dato pieces is Grey Sea. It has the "light and movement of the sea". Dato described it, saying, "As a work of art that is produced in contemporary Brunei, I perhaps can ponder that the absence of a solid object is a reflection of the state of a Bruneian psyche. The cornerstone of our way of thinking lies in the humble surrender to the spiritual and unknowable."

== Media ==
=== Utensils ===
Silver is a popular element for jewelry and utensils. Silver sheets are imported from there. Silversmiths make ornaments, flower vases and gongs (metal disk with a turned rim giving a resonant note when stuck). Another popular utensil is pasigupan, a type of mini pot that has a mandala print and holds tobacco.

Silvercrafting is a means of preserving family traditions and a profitable cottage industry.

=== Weaving ===
Weaving skills have been passed across generations. Brunei produces fabric for making gowns and sarongs. "The weaving and decoration of cloth as well as wearing, display, and exchange of it, has been an important part of Bruneian culture for years (Orr 96)." Weaving became significant in the 15th century. Antonio Pigafetta visited Brunei during his travels and observed how the clothes were made. One example was a Jongsarat, a handmade garment used for weddings and special occasions. It typically includes a hint of silver and gold. It can be used for wall coverings.

The two types of clothing in Brunei are called Batik and Ikat. Batik is dyed cotton cloth decorated through a technique known as wax-resist dyeing. Workers start with plain cotton and draw patterns with melted wax. The cloth is dipped in dye that colors unprotected fabric. Waxing and dyeing continues until the pattern is complete. In the past, only certain people were allowed to wear certain patterns while others had to wear Itak. Batik clothing was limited to royalty in Brunei and Malaysia.

Ikat is made through a similar process as Batik, Instead of dyeing the pattern onto finished cloth, it is created during weaving. The weaver lays out the threads onto to the loom, then measures their length. The thread is then later wrapped in bark and tied up tightly so that when it is dyed, the color cannot reach all the thread. The process is repeated with different dyes. The thread is then strung on the loom. Ikat patterns were often specific to cultural groups, and patterns were passed down from generation to generation.
