= Inai (dance) =

Malay traditional dance

Inai dance
- Native name: Tarian Inai
- Origin: Malaysia

Inai dance or Terinai dance is a traditional Malay dance. This dance is a court dance performed during the circumcision ceremony of the children of the palace dignitaries. It is presented to these children as they are about to be circumcised and sit on the throne. Inai dance is popular in Perlis, northern Kedah, and Kelantan. This Inai dance is rarely performed compared to other palace dances, as it is dedicated to certain events such as weddings, circumcisions, and royal coronations.

This dance has a ceremonial origin and has intricate finger and hand movements in a continuous circular dance movement. It has a combination of dance movements found in Mak Yong, Silat and acrobatic positions known as bending, in which the dancer bends his body backward while standing with his face looking at the floor. In the past, this dance was performed by two men.

However, there is another Inai Dance from Perak that is danced by the palace maids in the flower garden. This dance is in conjunction with the night of Berinai Kecil and Berinai Besar. The hosts of the palace will dance and sing while picking henna leaves that will be used on the night of berinai. This practice is still continued in Perak. The main musical instruments are drums, gongs, and flutes.

Inai dance is also accompanied by the beat of Gendang Terinai by playing three songs, namely Temang Welo, Selong and Mak Inang. However, it is still played at regular wedding ceremonies.

== See also ==
- Malay dance
