= Perahu payang =

Traditional fishing boat from Malaysia

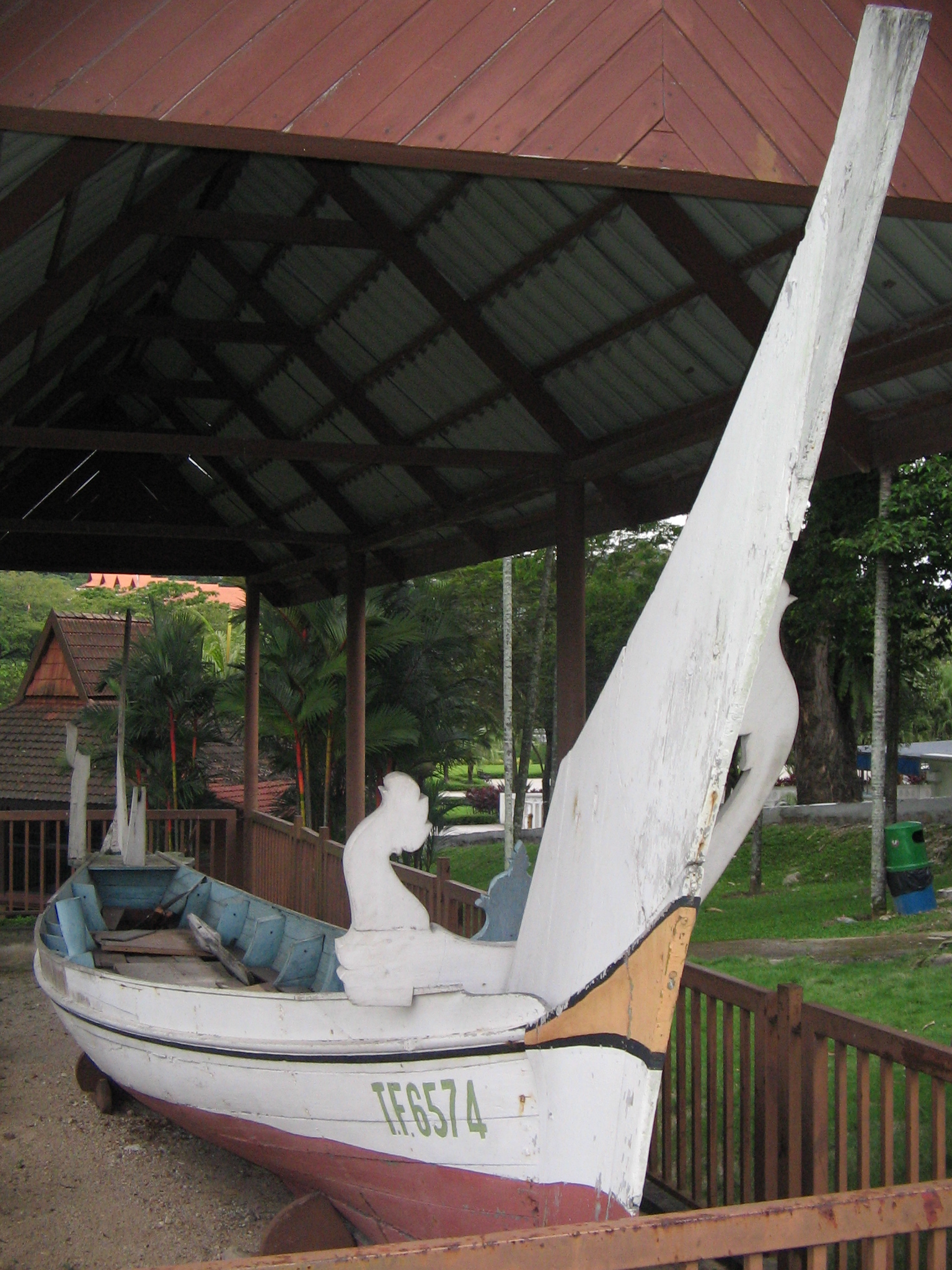
A payang in Muzium Negara, Malaysia.

Perahu payang or simply payang is a traditional Malay open fishing boat. They are usually found in Terengganu, and to a lesser extent, Kelantan, Pahang, and Johor coasts. A few examples normally come down to Singapore to operate during the period of the north-east monsoon in the South China Sea.

== Etymology ==
The name perahu payang comes from payang (a type of seine) used by local fishermen. Perahu is Malay word for boat and/or ship. Thus the name can be translated as "a boat that use payang".

== Description ==
Perahu payang has a crew of 15–20 men when fishing. It carries a net which the name derives, the pukat payang. The perahu payang ranges in length from about 33–45 feet (10–13.7 m) with a beam of 6 to more than 7 feet (1.8–2.1 m). The bow and stern are built up fantastically giving a most striking appearance. These ends, the keel and bottom planks are built of chengai wood, the top planks usually being serayah wood. The upper strakes of Malay boats, timbau, are usually made of light woods as serayah or medang to support the crew and nets should the boat be swamped. If built of chengai wood only the boat would sink. It has 2 spars rest, 1 forward and 1 aft.

It carried two rectangular sails on two masts. The sail is taller than its wide. The mainmast decidedly bent over at the top to give a certain springiness when meeting the wind. There is a gaff and a boom in the sail. Payangs are provided with an anchor, also 13 or 14 oars, 4 or 5 pengayoh (paddle), and kemudi sepak (large oar which is used for steering) which is held over the lee quarter. They carry a small boat called sampan payang, about 6 feet (1.8 m) long by 2 feet (61 cm) beam. Near the bow is a painted carved figurehead usually like the head of a dragon. The bow is also decorated by a necklace made from the pinang tree called mayang pinang. They also carry one or two long poles (quant/punting poles) are carried for use in shallow water, a small landing net and a wire hoop strung with cockle shells (kulit krang) on the end of a stick. This wire hoop is used for frightening the fish into the net by shaking it under the water when it makes a rattling sound. It carried a large net, called pukat petarang, measuring about 110 to 120 feet (33.5 to 36.6 m) long by 18 feet (5.5 m) wide.

== Gallery ==
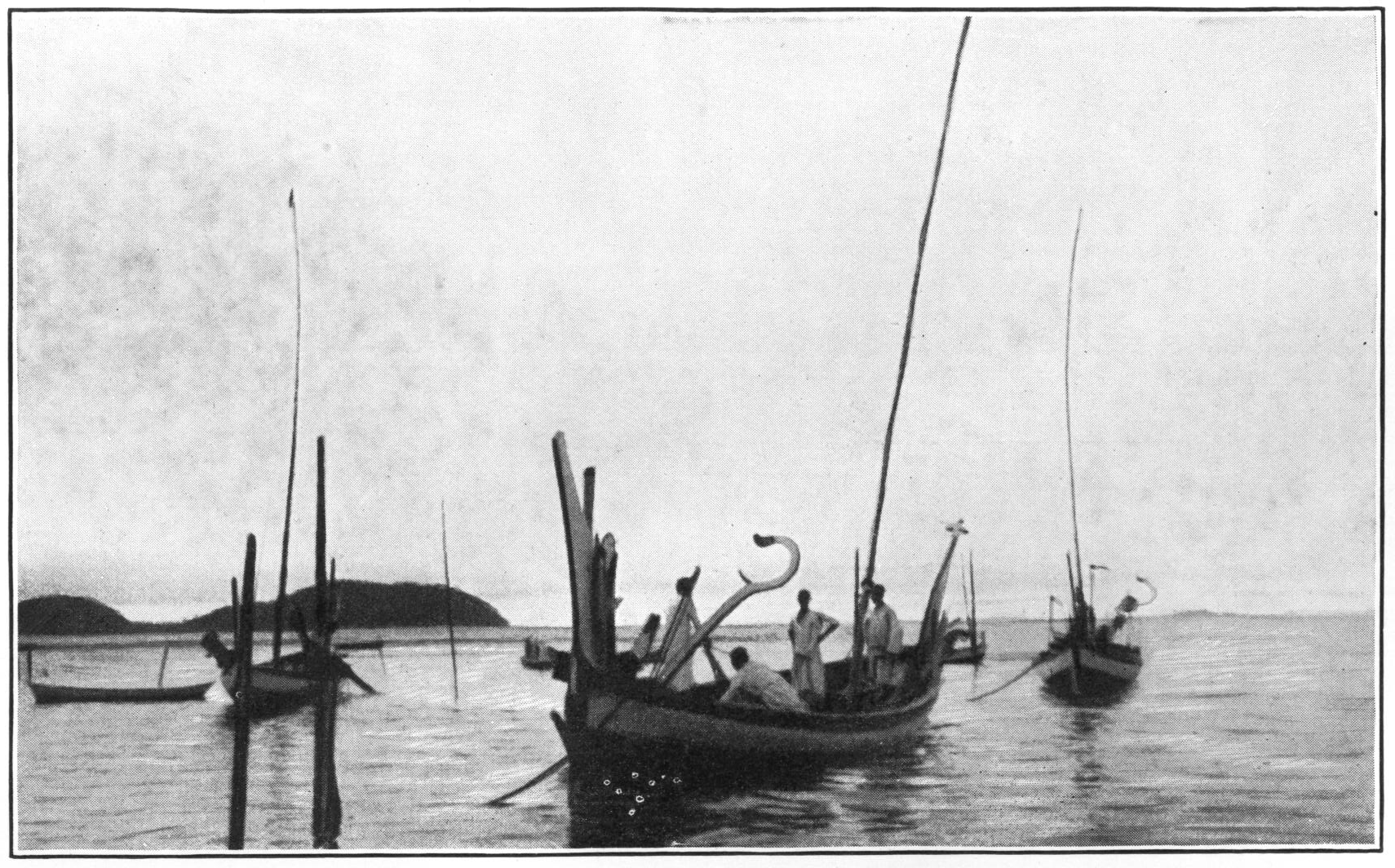
Two perahu payang with curved masts.

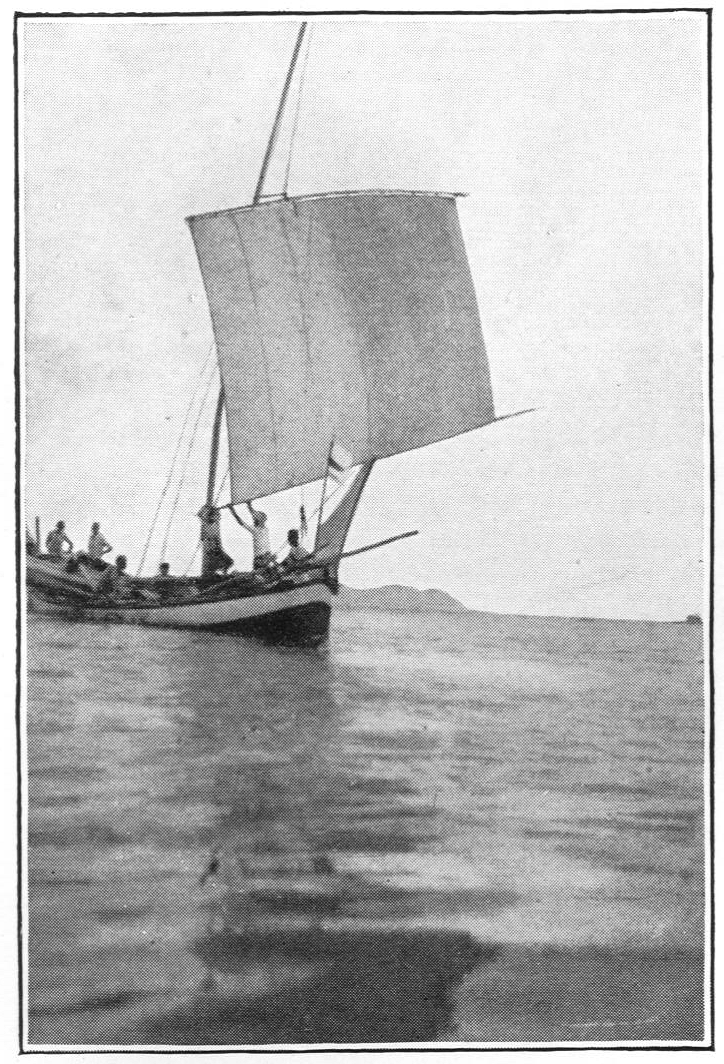
Roller-reefing the sail of a perahu payang.

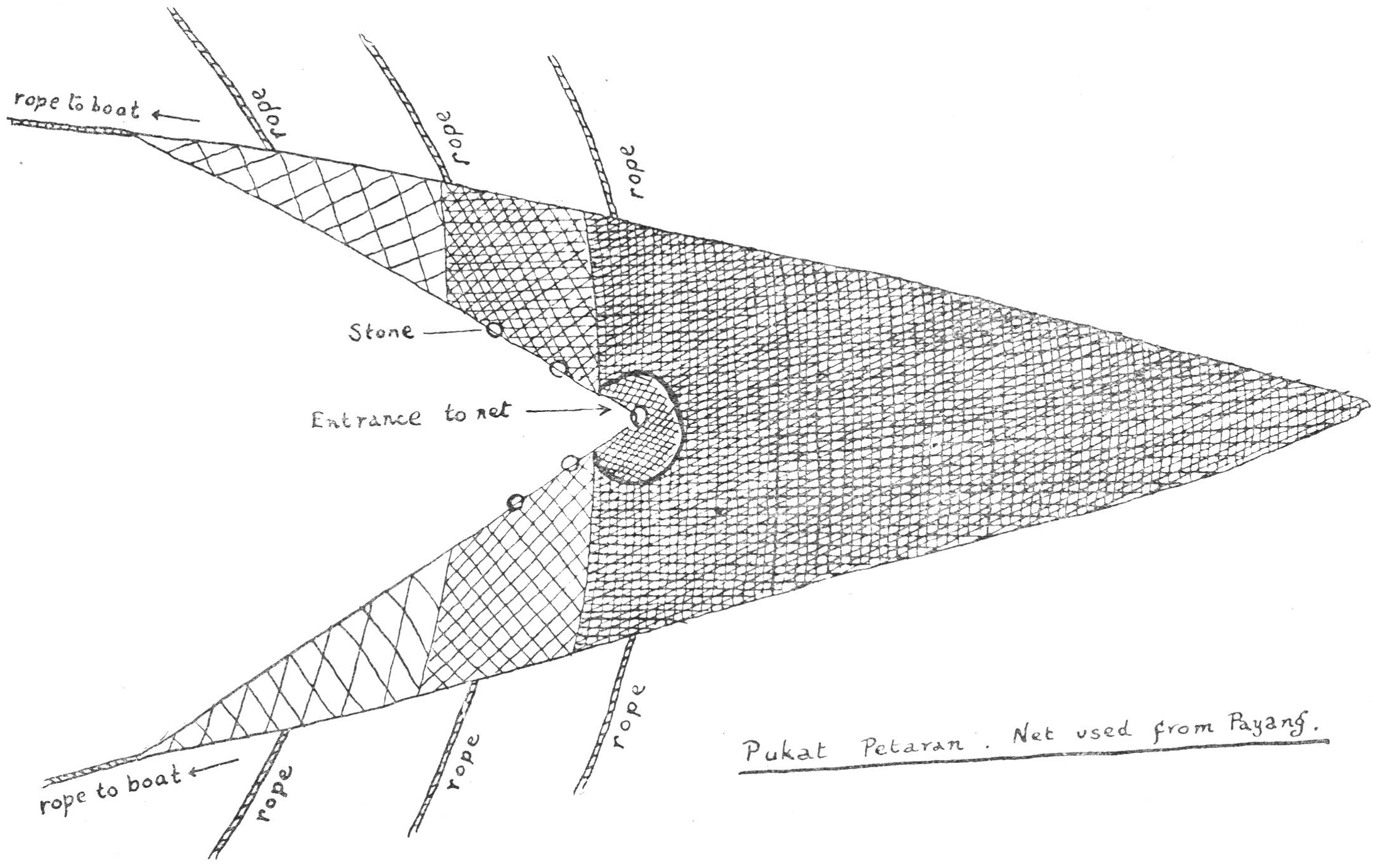
Pukat petarang, a type of net used from a perahu payang.

== See also ==
- Perahu mayang, a fishing boat from Java
- Kakap, fishing boat from Indonesia, Malaysia, and Brunei
- Birau
- Buggoh
