= Traditional Malaysian musical instruments =

Malaysian musical instruments

Traditional Malaysian instruments are the musical instruments used in the traditional and classical music of Malaysia. They comprise a wide range of wind, string, and percussion instruments, used by both the Malay majority as well as the nation's ethnic minorities.

== Percussion Instruments ==
- Bebendil - used in traditional performances in Sabah.
- Bonang Baron - used in classical Malay music of Malay Gamelan.
- Bungkau - used in traditional performances in Sabah.
- Canang
  - Canang Anak - used in traditional performances such as Wayang Kulit, Mak Yong and Main Puteri.
  - Canang Ibu - used in traditional performances such as Wayang Kulit, Mak Yong and Main Puteri.
- Gabbang - used in traditional performances in Sabah.
- Gambang Kayu - used in classical Malay music of Malay Gamelan.
- Gedombak
  - Gedombak Anak - used in traditional performances such as Wayang Kulit
  - Gedombak Ibu - used in traditional performances such as Wayang Kulit
- Geduk
  - Geduk Anak - used in traditional performances such as Wayang Kulit
  - Geduk Ibu - used in traditional performances such as Wayang Kulit
- Gendang - used in classical Malay music of Nobat and Malay Gamelan, and traditional performances such as Zapin.
  - Gendang Anak - used in traditional performances such as Wayang Kulit, Mak Yong and Main Puteri.
  - Gendang Ibu - used in traditional performances such as Wayang Kulit, Mak Yong and Main Puteri.
- Gongs or Tetawak - used in classical Malay music of Nobat and traditional performances such as Dondang Sayang.
  - Gong Agung - used in classical Malay music of Malay Gamelan.
  - Gong Anak - used in traditional performances such as Wayang Kulit, Mak Yong and Main Puteri.
  - Gong Ibu - used in traditional performances such as Wayang Kulit, Mak Yong and Main Puteri.
- Kenong - used in classical Malay music of Malay Gamelan.
- Kerincing - used in traditional performances such as Wayang Kulit Gedek
- Kertok Ulu - used in traditional performances in Terengganu.
- Kesi - used in traditional performances such as Wayang Kulit, Mak Yong and Main Puteri.
- Kompang - used in traditional performance at weddings.
- Konga - used in traditional performances such as Hamdolok
- Kulintangan - used in traditional performances in Sabah.
- Marakas - used in classical Malay music of Malay Ghazal and Hamdolok.
- Marwas - used in traditional performances such as Zapin and Hamdolok.
- Mong - used in traditional performances such as Wayang Kulit.
- Rebana - used in traditional performances such as Zapin and Dondang Sayang.
  - Rabana Perak - used in traditional performances in Perak.
  - Rabana Ubi - used in traditional performances in Kelantan.
- Saron
  - Saron Baron - used in classical Malay music of Malay Gamelan.
  - Saron Demung - used in classical Malay music of Malay Gamelan.
- Tabla - used in classical Malay music of Malay Ghazal.
- Tamborin - used in classical Malay music of Malay Ghazal and traditional performances such as Hamdolok.
- Togunggak - used in traditional performances in Sabah.

== String Instruments ==
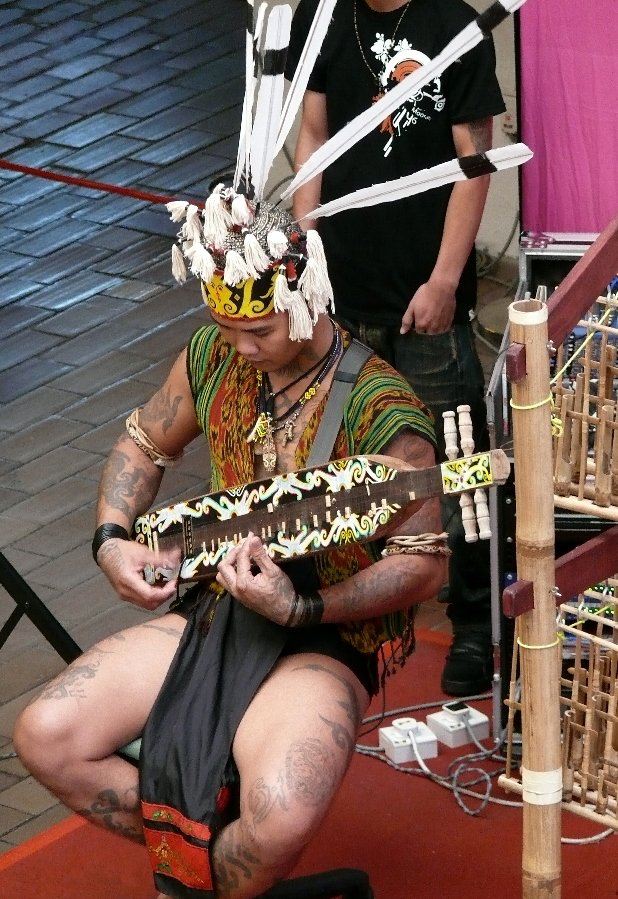
A Sape player performing in traditional costume.

- Biola - used in classical Malay music of Malay Ghazal and traditional performances such as Dondang Sayang.
- Kreb - used in traditional performances by Orang Asli.
- Gambus - used in classical Malay music of Malay Ghazal and traditional performances such as Zapin and Hamdolok.
  - Gambus Arab
  - Gambus Melayu
- Gitar - used in classical Malay music of Malay Ghazal.
- Rebab - used in traditional performances such as Wayang Kulit Melayu, Mak Yong and Main Puteri.
- Sape - used in traditional performances in Sarawak.
- Sundatang - used in traditional performances in Sabah.
- Tongkungon - used in traditional performances in Sabah.

== Wind Instruments ==
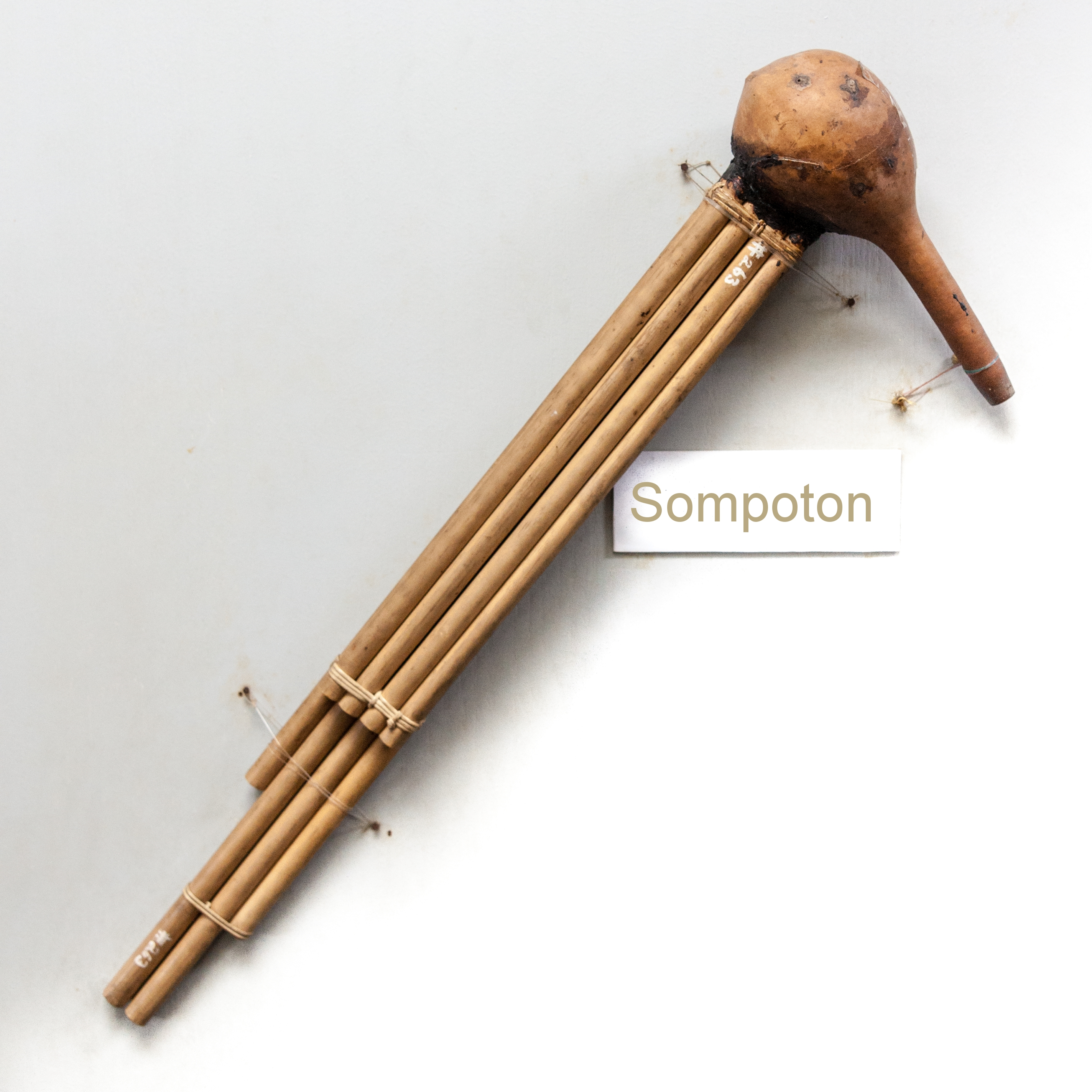
A Murut Sompoton.

- Accordion
- Harmonium - used in classical Malay music of Malay Ghazal.
- Nafiri - used in classical Malay music of Nobat
- Seruling
- Serunai - used in classical Malay music of Nobat and traditional performances such as Wayang Kulit, Menora and Silat.
  - Serunai Anak - used in traditional performances such as Wayang Kulit
  - Serunai Ibu - used in traditional performances such as Wayang Kulit
- Sompoton - used in traditional performances in Sabah
- Turali - used in traditional performances in Sabah

== See also ==
- Music of Malaysia
