= Malay gamelan =

Malay musical instrument and dance

Malay gamelan Gamelan Melayu ݢاميلن ملايو
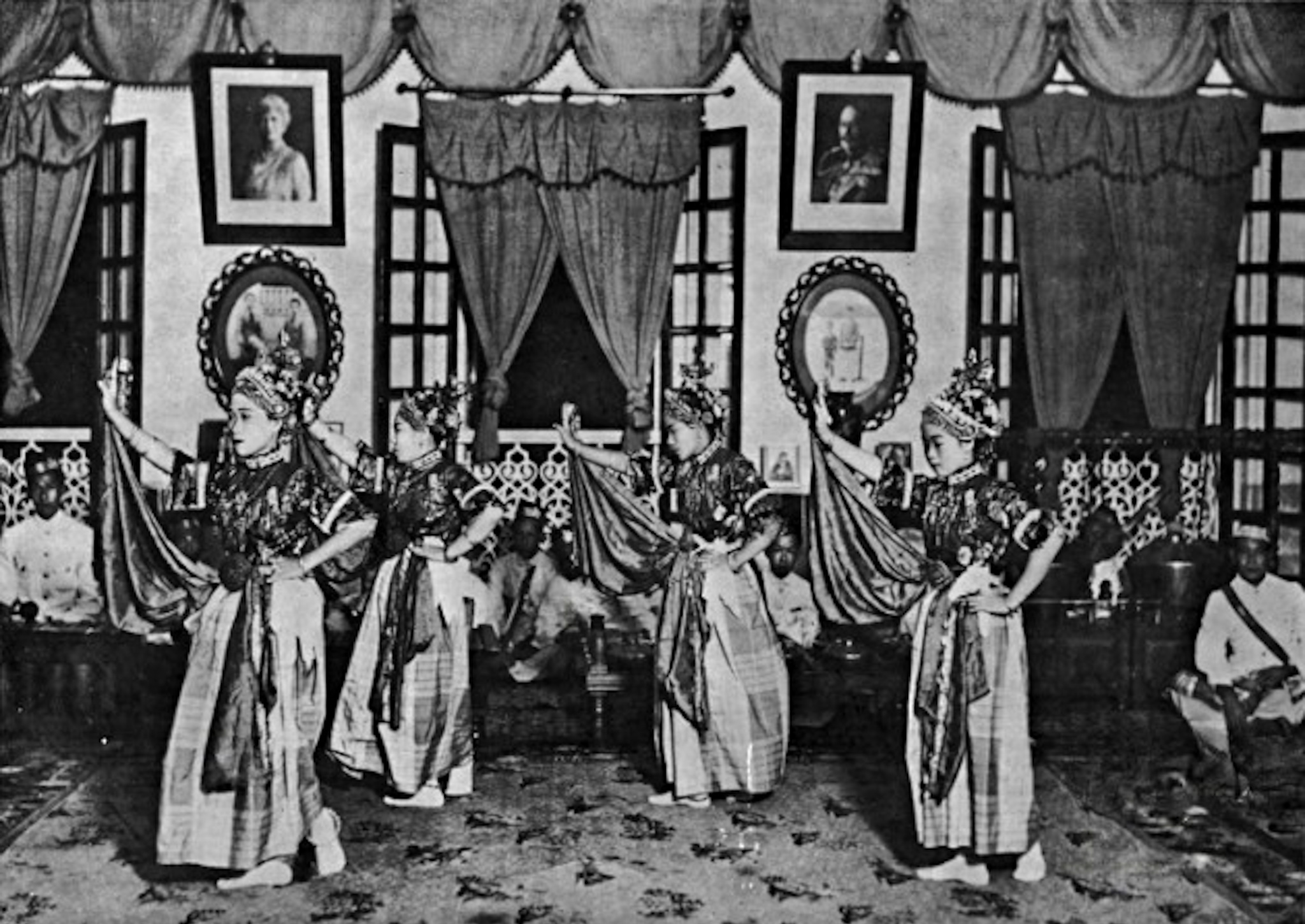
- A Malay gamelan performance at the Istana Maziah in Kuala Terengganu, Terengganu. (1937)
- Other names: Gamelan Pahang; Gamelan Terengganu
- Classification: Percussion instrument; Idiophone; Gong
- Developed: Through circulation within Johor–Riau, Riau–Lingga, Pahang and Terengganu court network

More articles or information
- Gamelan

Malay gamelan (Malay: gamelan Melayu), also known as Joget Gamelan, is a traditional court musical ensemble and dance tradition of the Malay world, particularly associated with the royal courts of Pahang and Terengganu in present-day Malaysia. It forms part of the wider gamelan family of maritime Southeast Asia but developed a distinct repertoire, performance practice and choreographic tradition within the cultural environment of the Malay courts.

The tradition traces its origins to the court culture of the Johor–Riau and Riau–Lingga sultanates and was introduced to Pahang during the early nineteenth century through dynastic connections between Malay ruling houses. Under the patronage of the Pahang and later Terengganu courts, Malay gamelan evolved into a highly refined court art characterised by a relatively small ensemble of metallophones, gongs, drums and xylophones, accompanied by a repertoire of stylised dances collectively known as Joget Gamelan.

Malay gamelan reached its greatest development during the reign of Sultan Sulaiman Badrul Alam Shah of Terengganu (1920–1942) and the patronage of Tengku Ampuan Mariam, under whom its repertoire, choreography and performance conventions were expanded and formalised. Following a period of decline after the Second World War, the tradition was revived during the 1960s through the efforts of former court performers, cultural institutions and scholars, leading to its re-establishment as a public performing art.

Today, Malay gamelan is performed by cultural organisations, universities and arts institutions throughout Malaysia. It is recognised as an important component of Malaysia's intangible cultural heritage and was entered into the National Heritage Register in 2009.

== Terminology ==
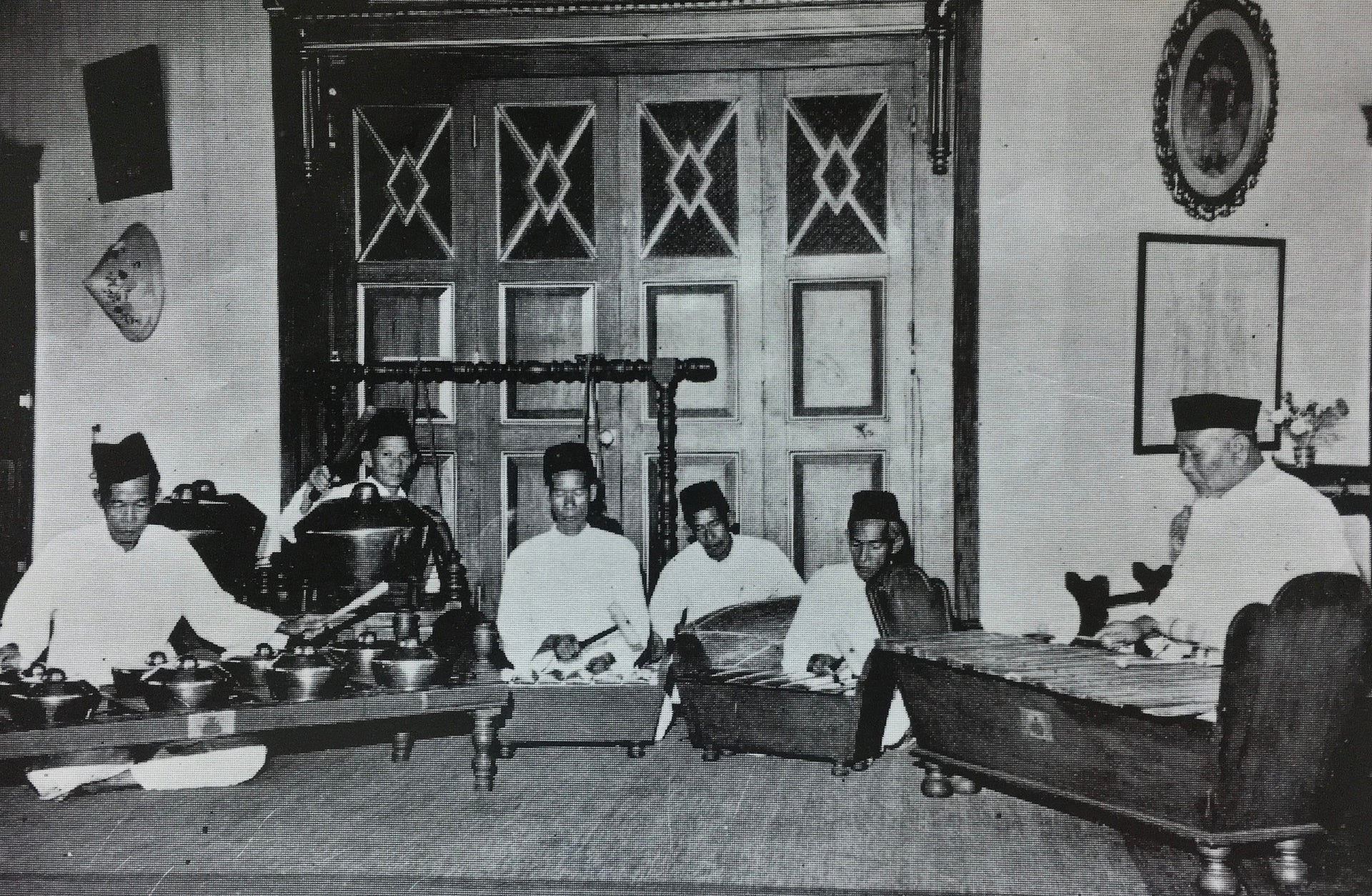
Former court musicians, Muhammad Ismail (Pak Mat Nobat, right) and Hamid (left), 1966

The term gamelan refers to a family of Southeast Asian percussion-based ensemble traditions characterised by metallophones, gongs, drums and related instruments. It is derived from the Javanese word gamel, meaning “to strike” or “to hammer”, a reference to the predominantly struck percussion instruments typical of these ensembles. In maritime Southeast Asia, the term has historically been used for a range of related musical traditions with regional variations in instrumentation, repertoire and performance practice. In the Malay world, gamelan came to denote a distinct court ensemble tradition associated with the royal courts of Johor-Riau, Riau–Lingga, Pahang and later Terengganu, from which the modern Malay gamelan tradition developed.

The nomenclature of the tradition has varied over time in accordance with its principal centres of patronage. Historical sources most commonly refer to gamelan Pahang, reflecting the development of the tradition within the Pahang royal court during the nineteenth century. Following its transfer to and subsequent flourishing in Terengganu during the early twentieth century, it also became known as Joget Terengganu or Gamelan Terengganu, particularly in reference to the court repertoire maintained at the Terengganu palace.

The accompanying dance tradition was known as Joget Gamelan, a term combining the Malay word joget ("dance") with gamelan. According to Marion D'Cruz, joget was historically used in the Malay world to denote dance and movement-based performance traditions, predating the widespread adoption of the modern term tari. In this context, Joget Gamelan referred specifically to the court dance repertoire performed with gamelan accompaniment and should not be confused with the social dance genre of the same name found elsewhere in the Malay world.

The term gamelan Melayu ("Malay gamelan") became increasingly common during the late twentieth century and is now the designation most widely used in Malaysia, particularly in academic writing, cultural institutions and heritage discourse. In contemporary usage, the term generally refers to the court gamelan tradition historically associated with the royal courts of Pahang and Terengganu rather than to gamelan music more broadly. Its wider adoption coincided with the revival of the tradition after the 1960s, when performances expanded beyond the royal courts into universities, cultural organisations and public arts programmes.

Although Malay gamelan shares historical connections with the broader gamelan traditions of the Southeast Asian archipelago, particularly those of Central Java, it developed distinctive characteristics in repertoire, instrumentation, musical structure, choreography and performance practice. Compared with Central Javanese gamelan, Malay gamelan generally employs a smaller ensemble and places greater emphasis on accompanying court dance performance, while differing from Balinese gamelan in its musical texture, tempo and ceremonial function.

== History ==
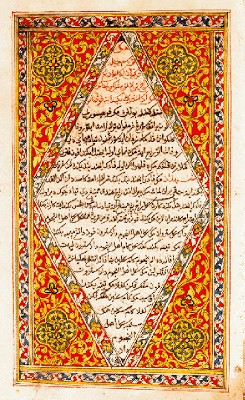
Manuscript of the Sejarah Melayu (Malay Annals), which records early Malay references to instruments associated with gamelan traditions

=== Early references to gamelan in the Malay world ===
References to gamelan traditions in the Malay world appear in several early Malay literary works. One of the earliest known mentions occurs in the Hikayat Banjar, a chronicle compiled in the 17th century, which describes a ceremonial river procession accompanied by various musical ensembles, including gamelan cara Malayu (Malay-style gamelan), alongside Makassarese, Chinese and Javanese forms of gamelan. The passage indicates that different regional styles of gamelan were recognised within the Malay Archipelago at the time of the text's compilation.

A further reference appears in the Malay Annals (Sejarah Melayu) compiled in its surviving form in the early 17th century from earlier traditions. In its account of Sultan Mansur Shah of Malacca visit to Majapahit, the chronicle describes a court celebration lasting forty days and forty nights during which Malay and Javanese musical ensembles performed together. Among the instruments listed are the sekati, celimpong and gambang, all of which are associated with gamelan traditions. Although the term gamelan is not explicitly used, the passage records the presence of instruments commonly found in gamelan ensembles.

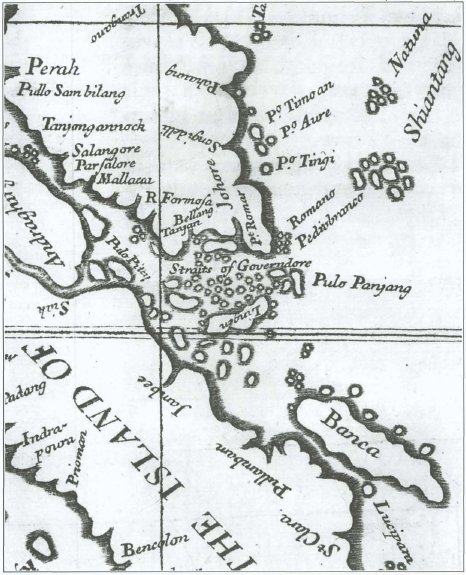
The Johor-Riau Sultanate in 1727. Court traditions from this polity later contributed to the development and transmission of Malay gamelan in Riau–Lingga, Pahang and Terengganu.

=== Emergence within the Johor–Riau cultural sphere ===
Malay gamelan developed within the interconnected court culture of maritime Southeast Asia, particularly among the Malay polities of the Malay Peninsula and the Riau Islands. Music, dance, literary traditions and ceremonial practices circulated extensively through networks of trade, diplomacy, migration and dynastic marriage, facilitating the transmission of artistic forms between royal courts throughout the region.

The broader gamelan tradition had long been established in parts of the Southeast Asian archipelago before becoming incorporated into Malay court culture. According to the gamelan scholar Dwiono Hermantoro, the presence of gamelan within the Malay world reflects the close cultural links that connected court centres across maritime Southeast Asia, where gamelan ensembles were commonly associated with aristocratic prestige and ceremonial refinement. Although the precise circumstances of its early introduction into the Malay courts remain uncertain, related gamelan traditions are known to have existed in several regional courts, including those of Banjar, Kutai and Lingga.

By the late 1700s, gamelan ensembles had become associated with aristocratic entertainment and ceremonial performance in court traditions linked to the Johor–Riau polity. Within the Malay courts, the ensemble was gradually adapted to local aesthetic preferences and became closely integrated with court dance traditions. Over time, a distinct repertoire, performance practice and musical style emerged, laying the foundations for the traditions later known as gamelan Pahang and gamelan Terengganu.

The close dynastic relationships that connected the Malay courts ensured the continued movement of musicians, dancers, instruments and repertoire between royal centres. As a result, traditions associated with the Johor–Riau court were maintained and adapted elsewhere in the Malay world, particularly in Lingga and Pahang, where gamelan subsequently developed as part of local court culture.

=== Gamelan in Riau–Lingga ===
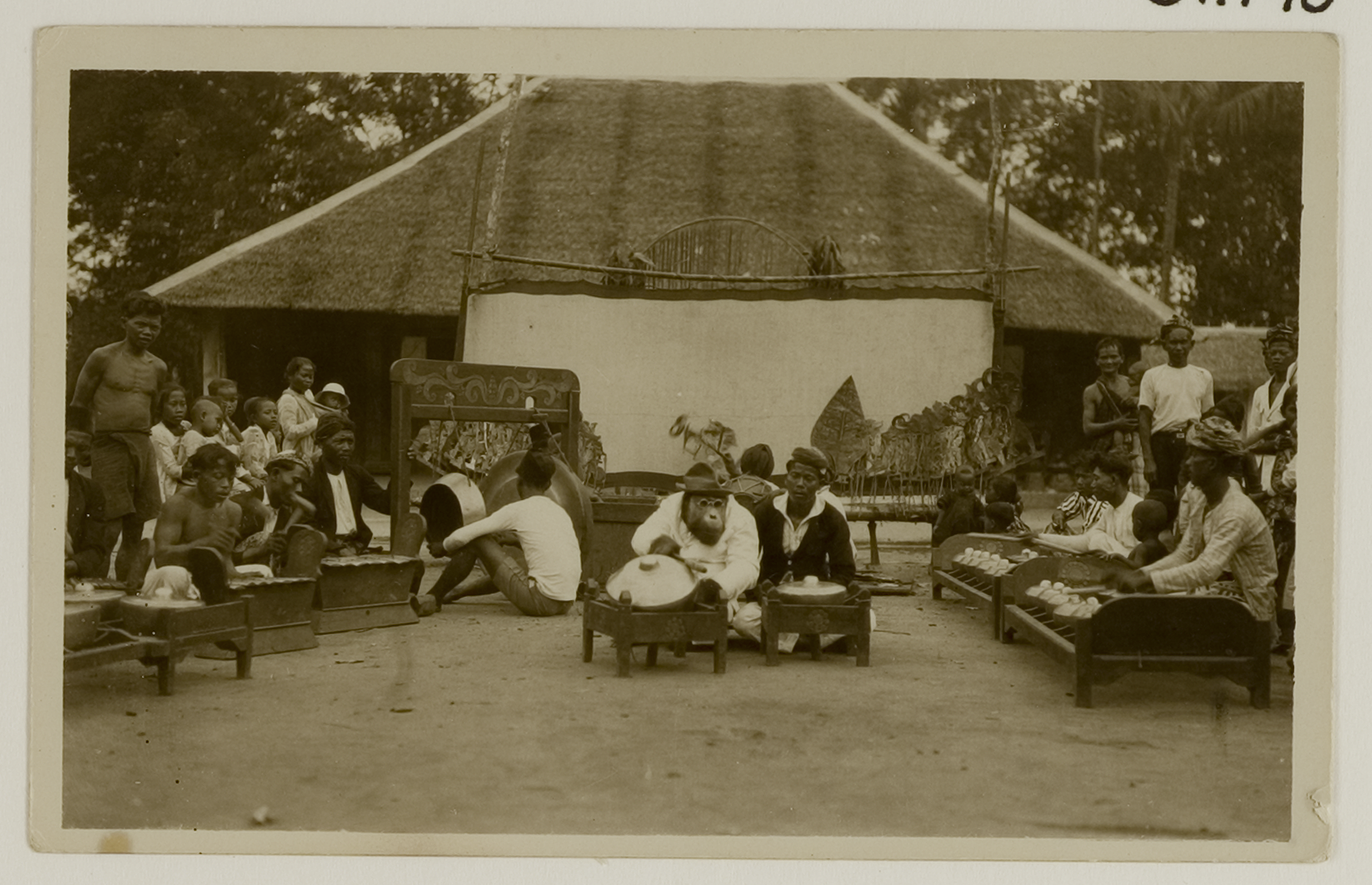
A gamelan ensemble on Galang Island, Riau Archipelago

Following the Anglo-Dutch Treaty of 1824, the southern portion of the former Johor–Riau polity developed into the Riau–Lingga Sultanate. The new court inherited many of the ceremonial and cultural traditions of its predecessor, including the patronage of gamelan ensembles. Through dynastic connections between the ruling houses of Riau–Lingga and Pahang, the tradition was transmitted to the Malay Peninsula during the early nineteenth century, where it later developed into the court traditions known as gamelan Pahang and gamelan Terengganu.

The decline of the Riau–Lingga Sultanate in the early twentieth century contributed to the disappearance of the tradition in its former centre. Following the deposition of Sultan Abdul Rahman Muazzam Shah II by the Dutch colonial authorities in 1911 and the subsequent dissolution of the sultanate, many aspects of court culture entered a period of decline, including the palace gamelan tradition.

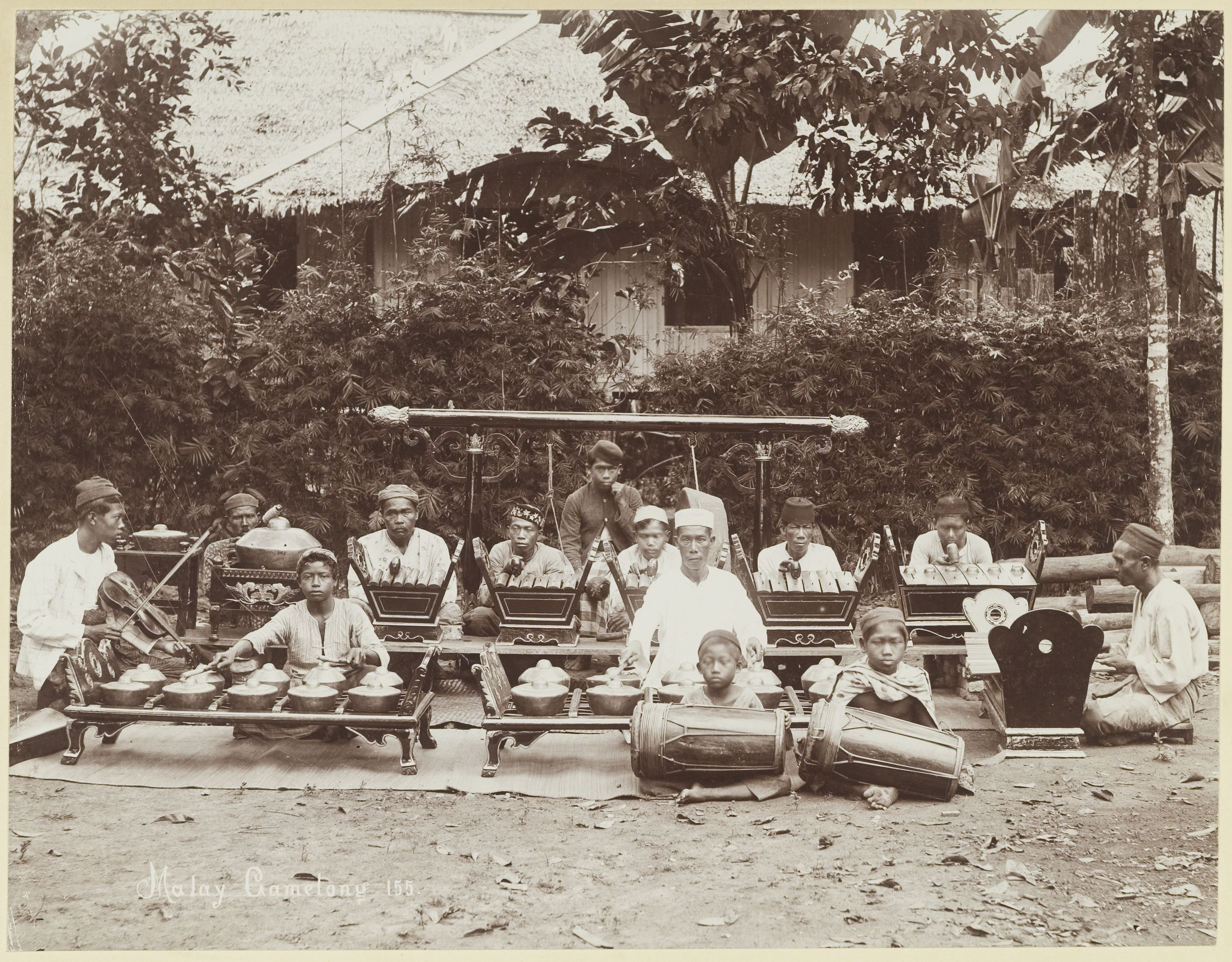
A Malay gamelan ensemble in the Straits Settlements, c. 1890.

Relatively little material evidence of the former Lingga court ensemble survives. According to local museum accounts, four bonang kettles attributed to the Lingga gamelan tradition are preserved at the Linggam Cahaya Museum in Daik. The instruments were reportedly discovered by residents of Kerandin village in East Lingga District and are among the few surviving artefacts associated with the court gamelan of the former Riau–Lingga Sultanate.

=== Establishment in Pahang ===
Malay gamelan became established in Pahang during the early nineteenth century. According to court tradition, a gamelan ensemble was brought from the Johor-Riau Sultanate to Pekan in 1811 in conjunction with a royal marriage between the ruling houses of Pahang and Johor-Riau. The instruments were reportedly accompanied by dancers and musicians from Pulau Penyengat for the wedding of Wan Esah, sister of Bendahara Tun Ali of Pahang, to Tengku Hussein, the eldest son of Sultan Mahmud Shah III of Johor-Riau. The ensemble subsequently entered the ceremonial life of the Pahang court, where it became known as gamelan Pahang and is regarded as the earliest documented Malay gamelan tradition established in the Malay Peninsula.

Some historical accounts also associate the development of the tradition with later contact between Pahang and the Riau–Lingga court at Daik. According to Pahang Dalam Sejarah, Bendahara Seri Maharaja Tun Ali visited Lingga in 1835 during celebrations marking the installation of Sultan Mahmud Muzaffar Shah, where gamelan performances formed part of court festivities. The account states that he subsequently brought to Pahang a gamelan ensemble comprising keromong (bonang), gambang, demung, saron, kenong, gongs and drums, together with a musician from Lingga known as Encik Basuk, who assisted in training court performers.

Had the performance I now describe nearly resembled any of those commonly seen here, or in the Peninsula, there could be little interest in this description, but in the belief that the sight as I saw it is a rare one, seldom witnessed by Europeans and so far undescribed, I have ventured to offer it, as it may, to some, be interesting.

— Frank Swettenham in A Malay Nautch, 1878

During the reign of Sultan Ahmad Al-Mu’adzam Shah (1863–1914), the tradition expanded under sustained royal patronage and became closely associated with a court performance tradition known as Joget Pahang. Performances were organised through several palace ensembles maintained by members of the royal household, including Tengku Ampuan Wan Fatimah, Che Zubedah and Che Besar. According to Mubin Sheppard, these groups functioned independently within the palace and contributed to the development of the repertoire and performance practice associated with the tradition. The dancers, known as budak joget, were generally drawn from within the court environment and received specialised training as performers attached to the palace.

Che Zubedah, a consort of Sultan Ahmad and the mother of Tengku Mariam, emerged as one of the principal patrons of Joget Pahang. She was closely involved in the training of dancers and musicians and played an important role in ensuring the continuity of the tradition within the court. Sheppard also noted the presence of stylistic features that distinguished the Pahang repertoire from other court dance traditions of the region, including variations in costume and headdress. He further observed that the melody of Timang Burung, one of the best-known compositions in the repertoire, bears similarities to a Chinese folk melody.

Contemporary descriptions by Frank Swettenham provide some of the earliest detailed accounts of Joget Pahang in performance. In A Malay Nautch (1878) and later in The Malay Sketches (1895), he described palace performances featuring budak joget accompanied by gamelan music, noting the elaborate costumes, ceremonial setting and performances that could continue from late evening until dawn.

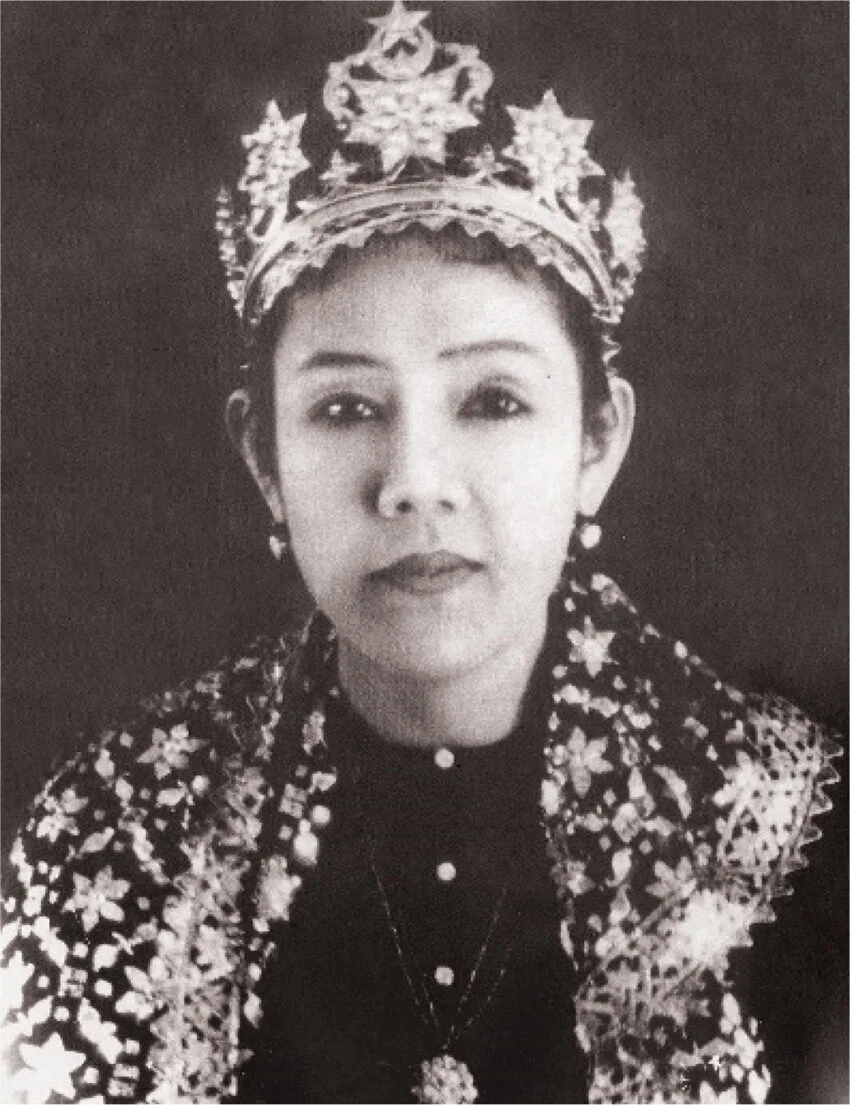
Tengku Ampuan Mariam, regarded as the Bonda Gamelan Melayu "Mother of Malay Gamelan" for her role in preserving and developing the tradition

By the late nineteenth century, Joget Pahang had become firmly established within the ceremonial culture of the Pahang court and was performed during royal weddings, receptions and other important occasions. The tradition remained largely confined to the palace and developed through a small number of court-sponsored ensembles. Within this environment, a distinctive repertoire of music and dance emerged, laying the foundations for the later development of Malay gamelan in Terengganu. Following the death of Sultan Ahmad in 1914, patronage within the Pahang court diminished and the centre of the tradition gradually shifted to Terengganu through the activities of Che Zubedah and her daughter, Tengku Ampuan Mariam.

=== Development at the Terengganu court ===
The introduction of gamelan to the Terengganu court was closely linked to dynastic connections between the royal houses of Pahang, Terengganu and Riau–Lingga. Its earliest recorded presence in Terengganu is associated with the marriage in 1885 between Tengku Long, daughter of Sultan Ahmad of Pahang and Sultan Zainal Abidin III, during which Joget Pahang was reportedly performed as part of the wedding celebrations. Although the marriage was subsequently dissolved, Sultan Zainal Abidin III developed an interest in the art and continued to sponsor performances at court, reportedly borrowing instruments and musicians from Riau–Lingga for palace occasions. The gradual decline of the Riau–Lingga Sultanate, culminating in Dutch intervention in 1911, contributed to the disappearance of its own court gamelan tradition.

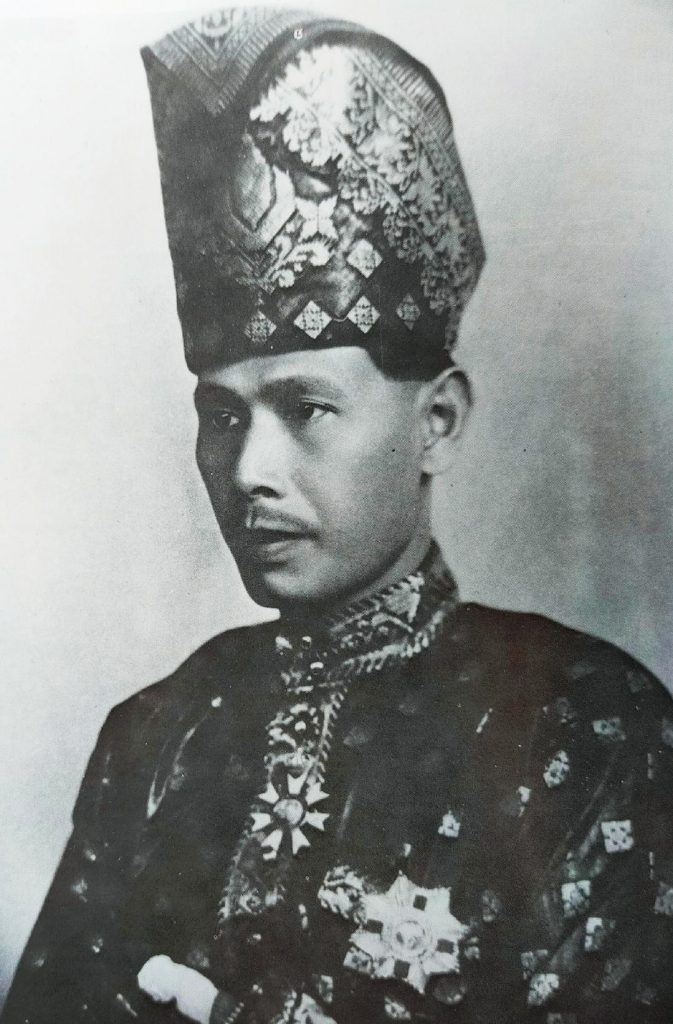
Sultan Sulaiman Badrul Alam Shah, during whose reign Joget Gamelan Terengganu attained its greatest prominence and repertoire expansion.

The establishment of gamelan as a permanent feature of Terengganu court culture is generally associated with the marriage in 1913 of Tengku Sulaiman, heir to the Terengganu throne and Tengku Mariam of Pahang. Following the marriage, Tengku Mariam brought musicians, dancers and gamelan instruments from Pahang to Terengganu and oversaw the training of local performers in the existing repertoire. After the death of Sultan Ahmad Al-Mu’adzam Shah in 1914, active patronage of Joget Pahang diminished in Pahang and Che Zubedah relocated to Terengganu in 1915 with instruments formerly associated with the Pahang court. Together, Che Zubedah and Tengku Mariam ensured the continuity of the tradition within the Terengganu palace, supported by Tengku Sulaiman, who took a keen interest in its development.

When Tengku Sulaiman ascended the throne as Sultan Sulaiman Badrul Alam Shah in 1920 and Tengku Mariam became Tengku Ampuan Mariam, gamelan entered its most significant period of growth in Terengganu. Known locally as Joget Terengganu, it became firmly integrated into palace ceremonial life and was regularly performed at Istana Maziah. The repertoire was expanded and standardised during this period and several dances now regarded as central to the tradition, including Timang Burung, Ayak-Ayak and Topeng, assumed their established forms. Although performances remained largely restricted to royal ceremonies and court festivities, the ensemble developed within a stable institutional setting that encouraged artistic continuity and refinement.

The royal couple actively supported the training of new performers. Former musicians from Pahang were invited to instruct local players, while Tengku Ampuan Mariam supervised the training of female dancers, including a group of adopted trainees known as budak joget. Through this system, musical and choreographic knowledge was transmitted within the palace and incorporated into established court etiquette and ceremonial practice.

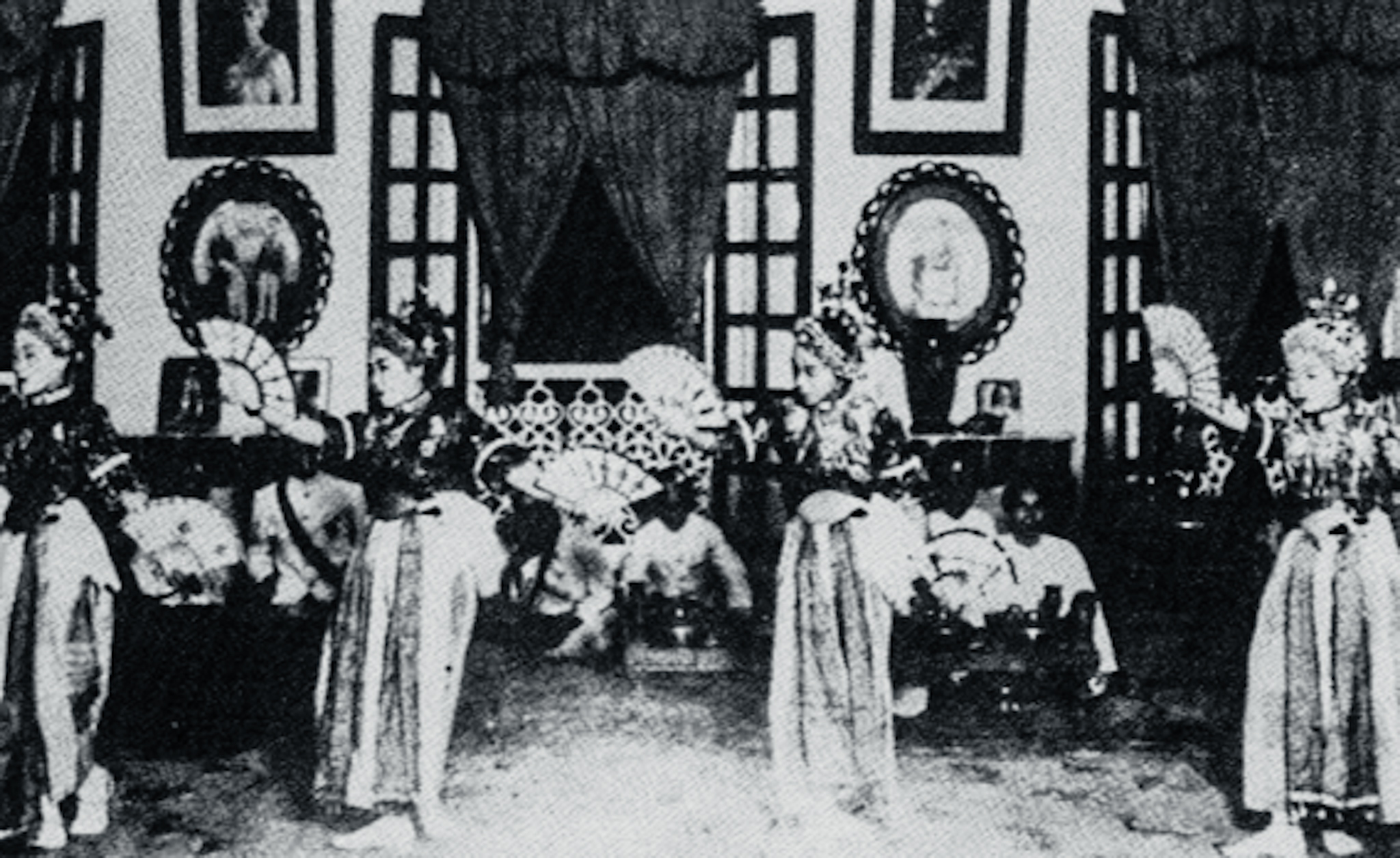
Joget Gamelan performers at the Istana Maziah, Terengganu, in 1937. From left: Adnan Abdullah, Khazimah, Cik Nik Enduk and Zaharah

The repertoire expanded considerably during the interwar years. According to Harun Mat Piah and Siti Zainon Ismail, approximately ninety-five compositions were produced during this period, around sixty of which were intended to accompany dance performances. Between 1928 and 1930, Sultan Sulaiman and Tengku Ampuan Mariam visited several centres of court culture in Southeast Asia, including Jakarta, Bogor, Sukabumi, Medan and Bangkok, where they observed palace arts and performance traditions. These experiences informed further developments in the Terengganu repertoire. Tengku Ampuan Mariam also produced manuscripts documenting court dances, while Sultan Sulaiman composed musical works and encouraged the continued development of the ensemble, which became increasingly known as Joget Gamelan Terengganu.

The exclusivity of the tradition nevertheless remained an important feature of palace culture. Performances were generally reserved for royal ceremonies, receptions and court festivals, and were presented predominantly by female court dancers. The instruments themselves formed part of the royal regalia and were maintained in accordance with palace protocol and custom.

The tradition reached another important stage in 1936, when the Terengganu court acquired its own gamelan set from Bali. During this period, Sultan Sulaiman and Tengku Ampuan Mariam actively expanded the repertoire and are credited with the creation of approximately 95 gamelan compositions, around 60 of which were accompanied by court dances. Contemporary accounts also describe Sultan Sulaiman as a skilled gamelan musician, while Tengku Ampuan Mariam produced a manuscript containing descriptions and illustrations of gamelan dances, which later became an important historical reference for the study of Malay gamelan traditions. By the early 20th century, the Terengganu court had emerged as an important centre for the preservation and development of Malay gamelan, which by then had acquired a distinct identity within the Malay courts, differing from Central Javan gamelan traditions in repertoire, choreography, musical texture and ceremonial function.

=== Decline and dormancy ===
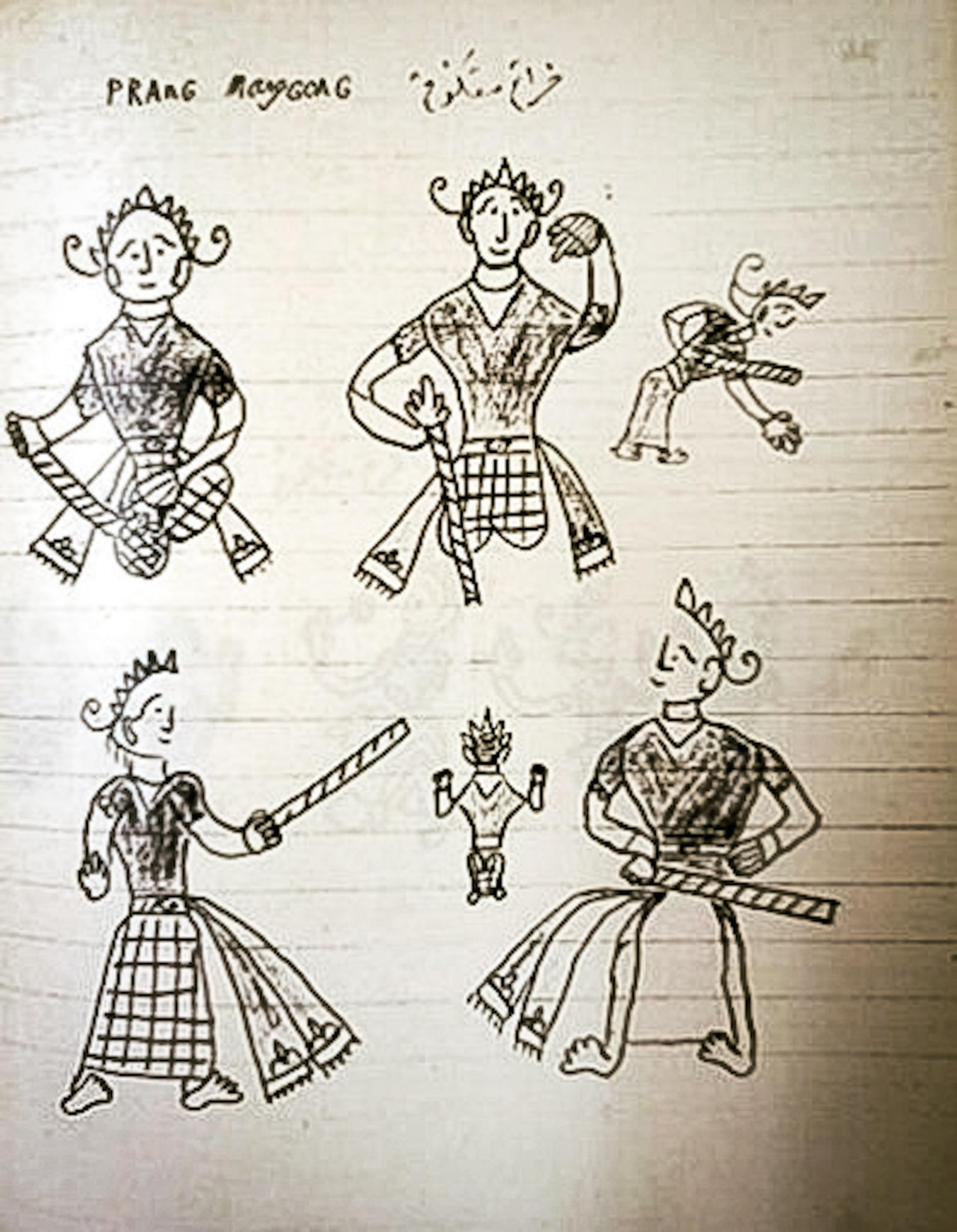
Perang Manggung dance

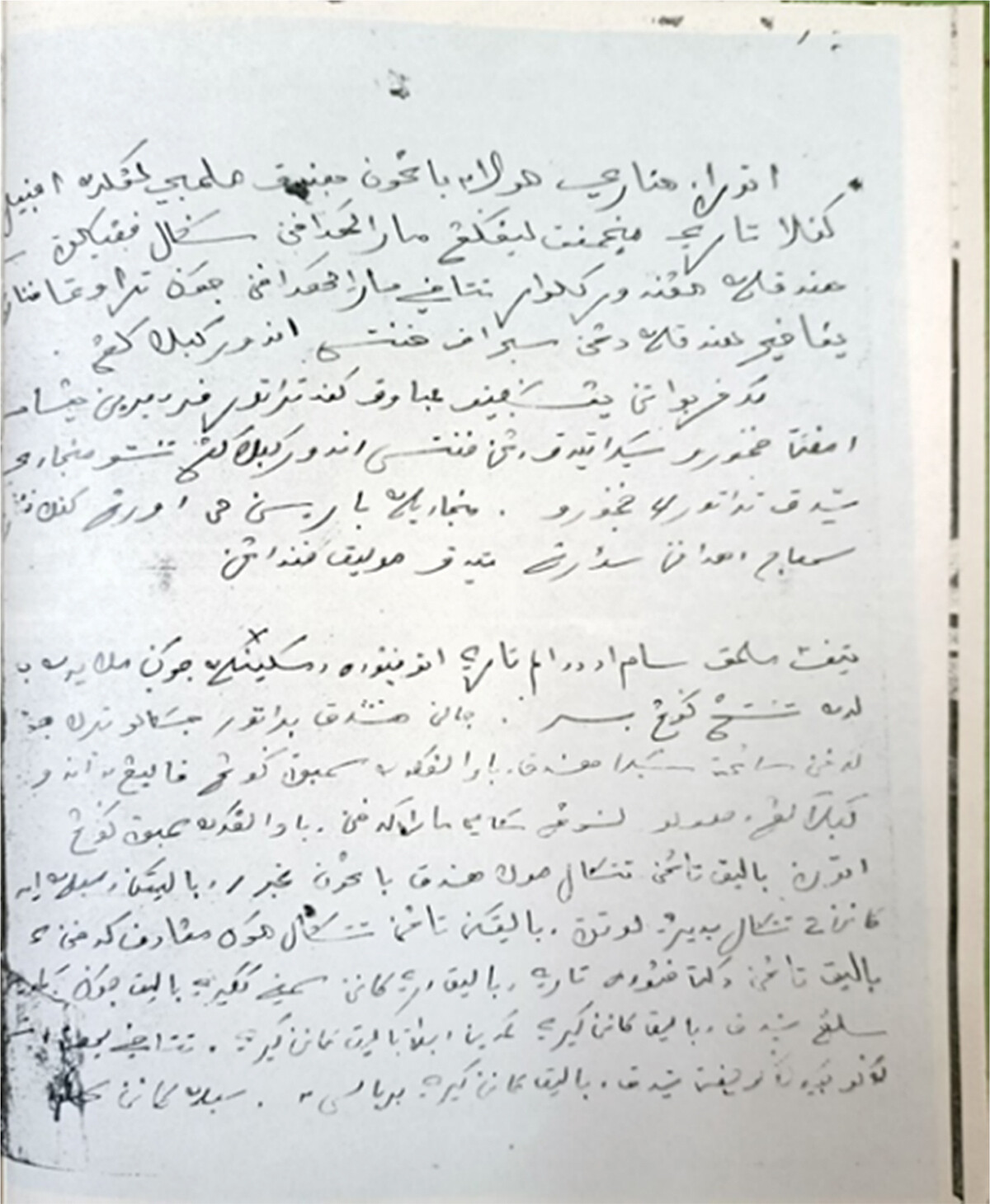
Performance conventions

Pages from the Manuscript Joget Gamelan, compiled in 1920s and written in Jawi script.

Malay gamelan declined during the mid-twentieth century amid broader political and social changes affecting the Malay royal courts. The disruption caused by the Second World War, together with the weakening of palace patronage and the growing prominence of new forms of public entertainment, contributed to the decline of court-based performing arts throughout the Malay Peninsula.

The death of Sultan Sulaiman Badrul Alam Shah in 1942 marked a turning point for the Terengganu gamelan tradition. Following his death, performances at the palace became increasingly infrequent and the ensemble ceased to function as a regular component of court ceremonial life. The gamelan instruments were subsequently placed in storage at Istana Kolam in Kuala Terengganu under the custodianship of Tengku Ampuan Mariam. According to Ahmad Omar Ibrahim, she later convened a gathering of former musicians and dancers and instructed them not to perform or transmit the repertoire outside the palace without her permission.

By the 1950s, the tradition was no longer actively performed. Knowledge of the repertoire survived principally through former court musicians and dancers, while the instruments remained preserved at Istana Kolam until efforts to revive the tradition began during the 1960s.

=== Revival and preservation ===
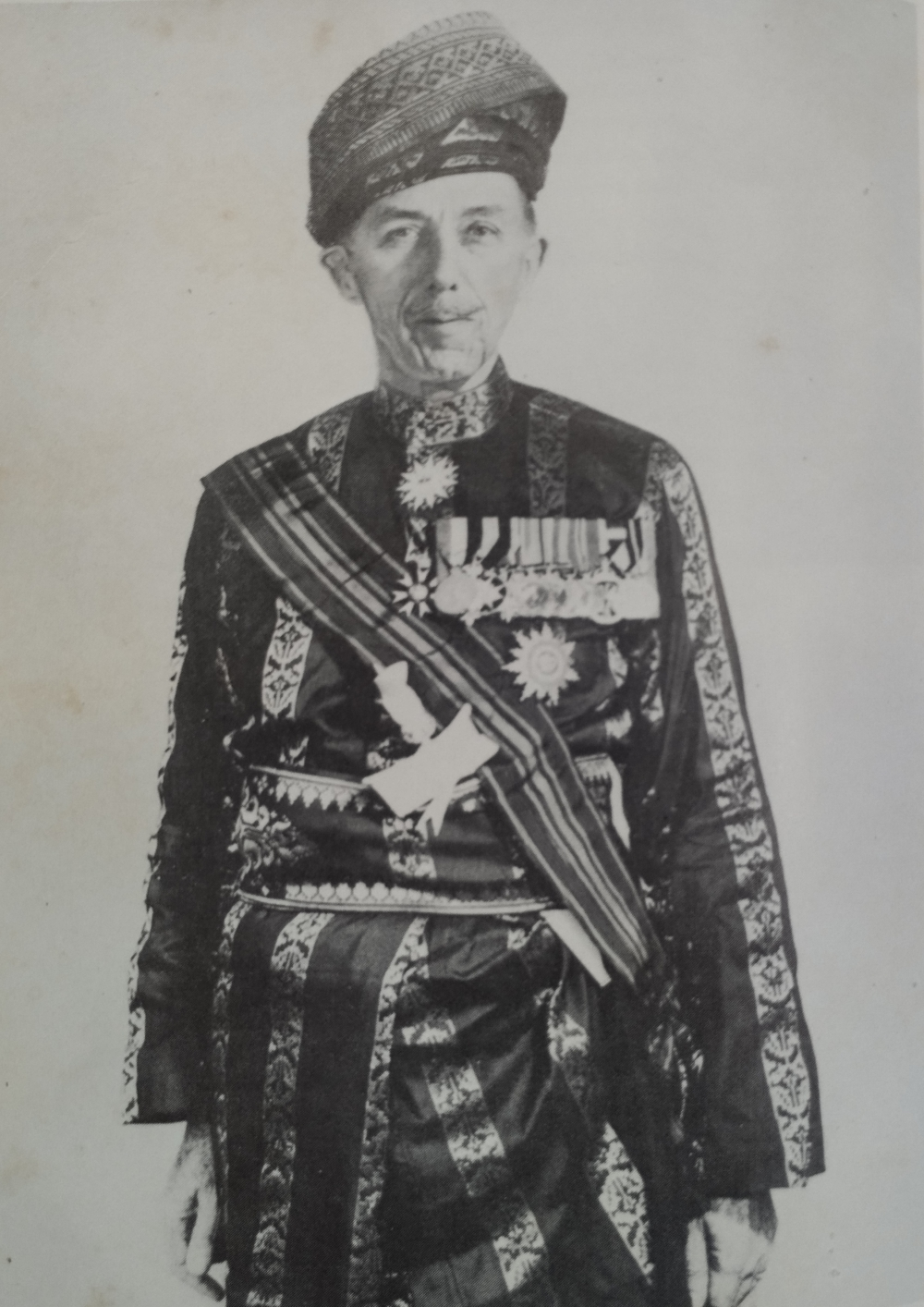
Mubin Sheppard, Director of the National Museum

Efforts to revive Malay gamelan began during the 1960s amid broader post-independence initiatives to document and preserve Malay cultural heritage. Early reconstruction work relied heavily on the knowledge of surviving former court performers, who retained memories of the repertoire, choreography and performance conventions that had ceased to be publicly practised after the Second World War. Among the principal figures involved was Ahmad Omar Ibrahim, who worked with former court dancers and musicians, including Mak Nang and Pak Mat Nobat, to recover elements of the Terengganu court tradition through oral transmission and practical demonstration.

A significant development occurred in 1966 when Tan Sri Mubin Sheppard, then Director of the National Museum, located the former Terengganu court gamelan instruments at Istana Kolam in Kuala Terengganu. Preserved under the custodianship of Tengku Ampuan Mariam since the suspension of court performances during the war years, the instruments provided an important material link to the earlier tradition. With her consent, efforts were undertaken to document the ensemble and reconstruct surviving aspects of its repertoire and performance practice.

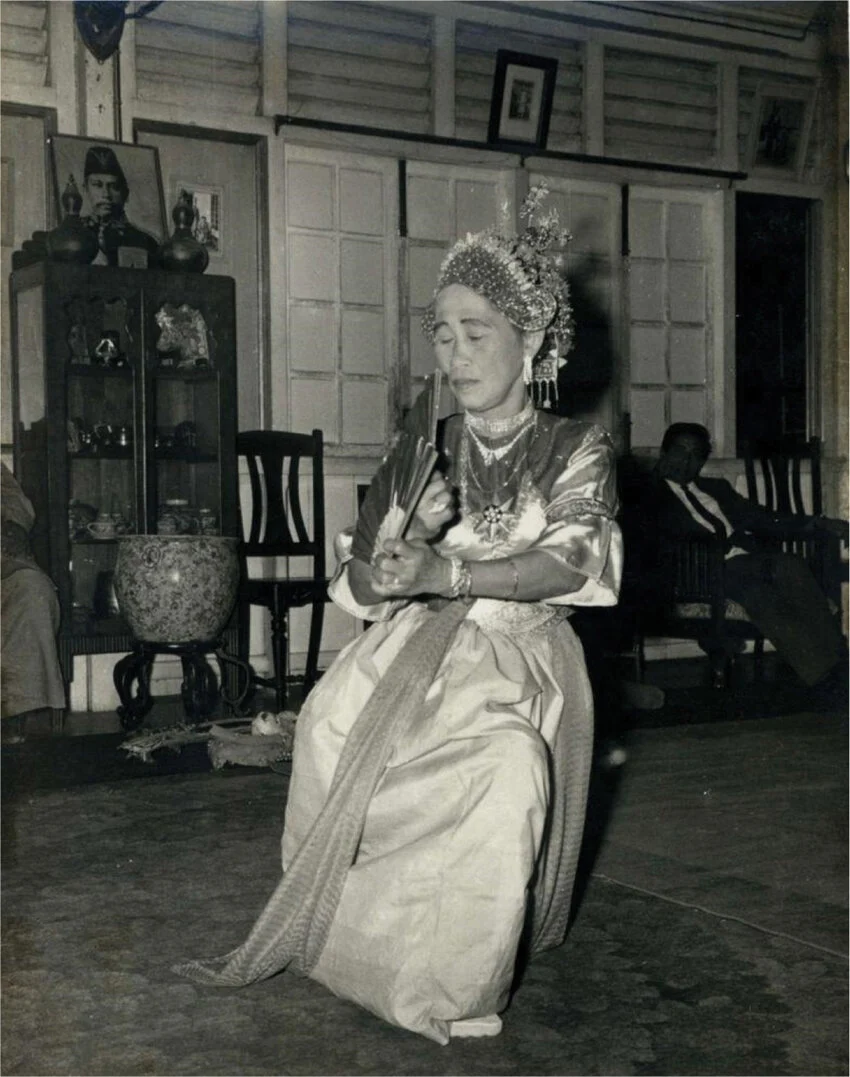
Puan Adnan binti Abdullah (Mak Nang), a former court dancer (budak joget), performing during the revival of Malay gamelan in 1966

Former palace performers subsequently played a central role in the revival. Mak Nang (Puan Adnan binti Abdullah), one of the last surviving court dancers, trained a new generation of performers based on remembered choreographic structures, while Muhammad bin Ismail, known as Pak Mat Nobat, assisted in reconstructing musical arrangements and performance conventions. In 1967, a revived performance was presented at Istana Kolam and recorded by Radio Televisyen Malaysia, marking one of the earliest documented public presentations of the tradition since its decline in the 1940s.

The revived ensemble, later known as the Orkes Gamelan Diraja Terengganu, made its first major public appearance at the Southeast Asian Music and Drama Festival held at Universiti Malaya in 1969. A further performance followed at the Temasya Seni Melayu in 1970, introducing Malay gamelan to audiences beyond the royal courts and generating renewed scholarly and public interest in the tradition. These events marked an important transition in the history of Malay gamelan, as a performance practice once confined largely to palace circles began to enter the cultural and educational institutions that would sustain its subsequent development.

=== Institutionalisation and transmission ===
Following its revival during the late 1960s and early 1970s, Malay gamelan gradually moved beyond its former palace setting and became incorporated into Malaysia's cultural, educational and heritage institutions. Responsibility for the preservation and transmission of the tradition increasingly shifted from former court performers and royal households to universities, cultural agencies and state-sponsored arts organisations, ensuring its continuity beyond the court environment in which it had originally developed.

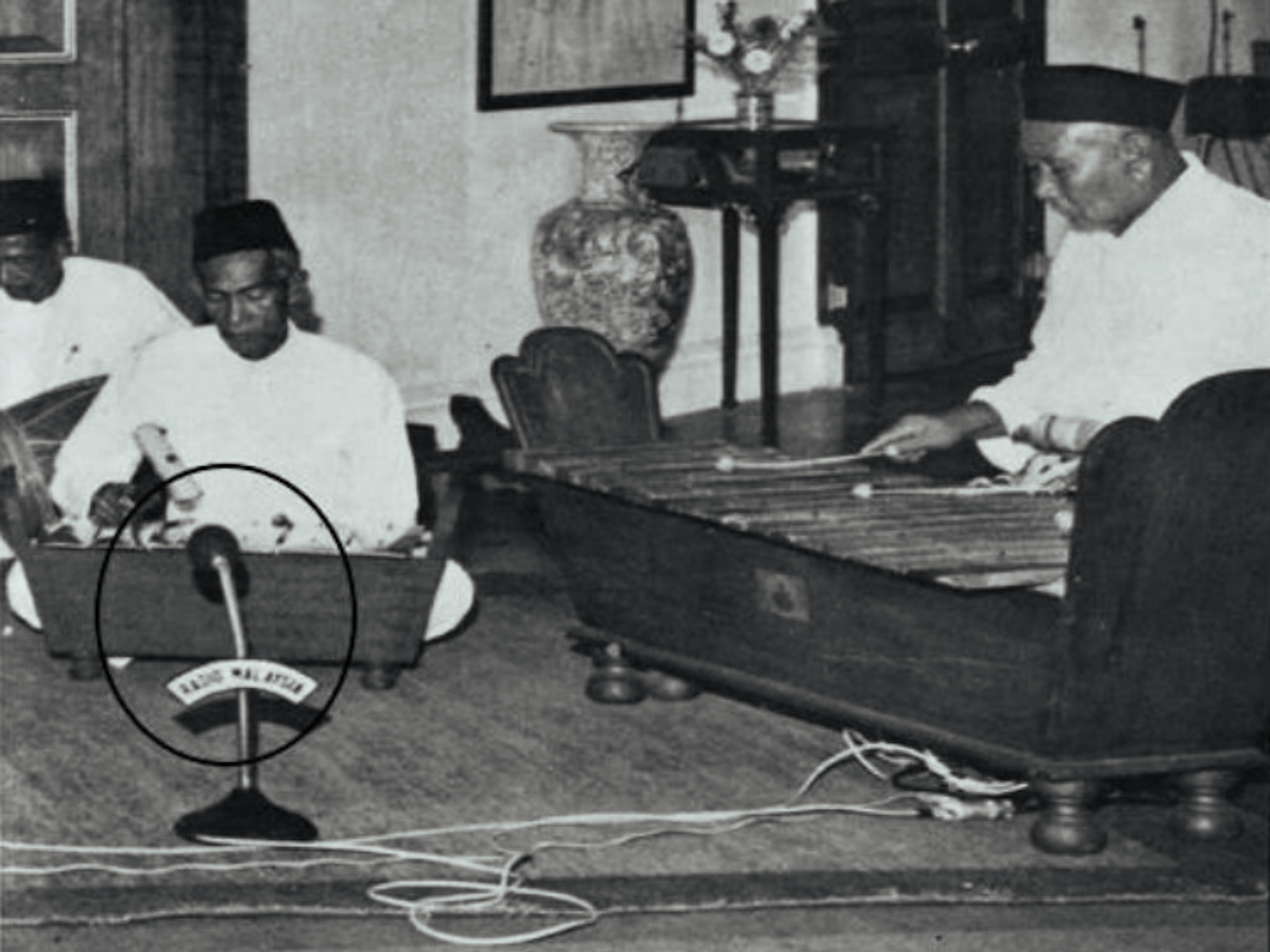
Muhammad Ismail (Pak Mat Nobat) performing the keromong during a Radio Malaysia recording session

One of the earliest developments was the establishment of the Kumpulan Kesenian Setiausaha Kerajaan Terengganu (SUKTRA), which became an important centre for performance and training in Terengganu. At the national level, the Ministry of Culture, Youth and Sports and the Kompleks Budaya Negara incorporated Malay gamelan into cultural programmes, festivals and official events, expanding its visibility and introducing the tradition to audiences beyond its historical court associations.

Scholarly interest in Malay gamelan also grew during this period. In 1980, Universiti Kebangsaan Malaysia hosted the First Malaysian Gamelan Symposium, bringing together performers, researchers and cultural practitioners to examine the history, repertoire and performance practices of Malay gamelan and related gamelan traditions in Malaysia. Subsequent workshops, conferences and documentation projects contributed to the recording of musical compositions, dance repertories and oral knowledge preserved by surviving court performers.

The expansion of higher education further transformed the transmission of the tradition. Whereas knowledge had previously been passed down through direct apprenticeship within the palace, Malay gamelan increasingly became the subject of structured instruction in universities and performing arts institutions. Dedicated ensembles were established and training programmes in both music and dance enabled the repertoire to be taught to students with no historical connection to the royal courts.

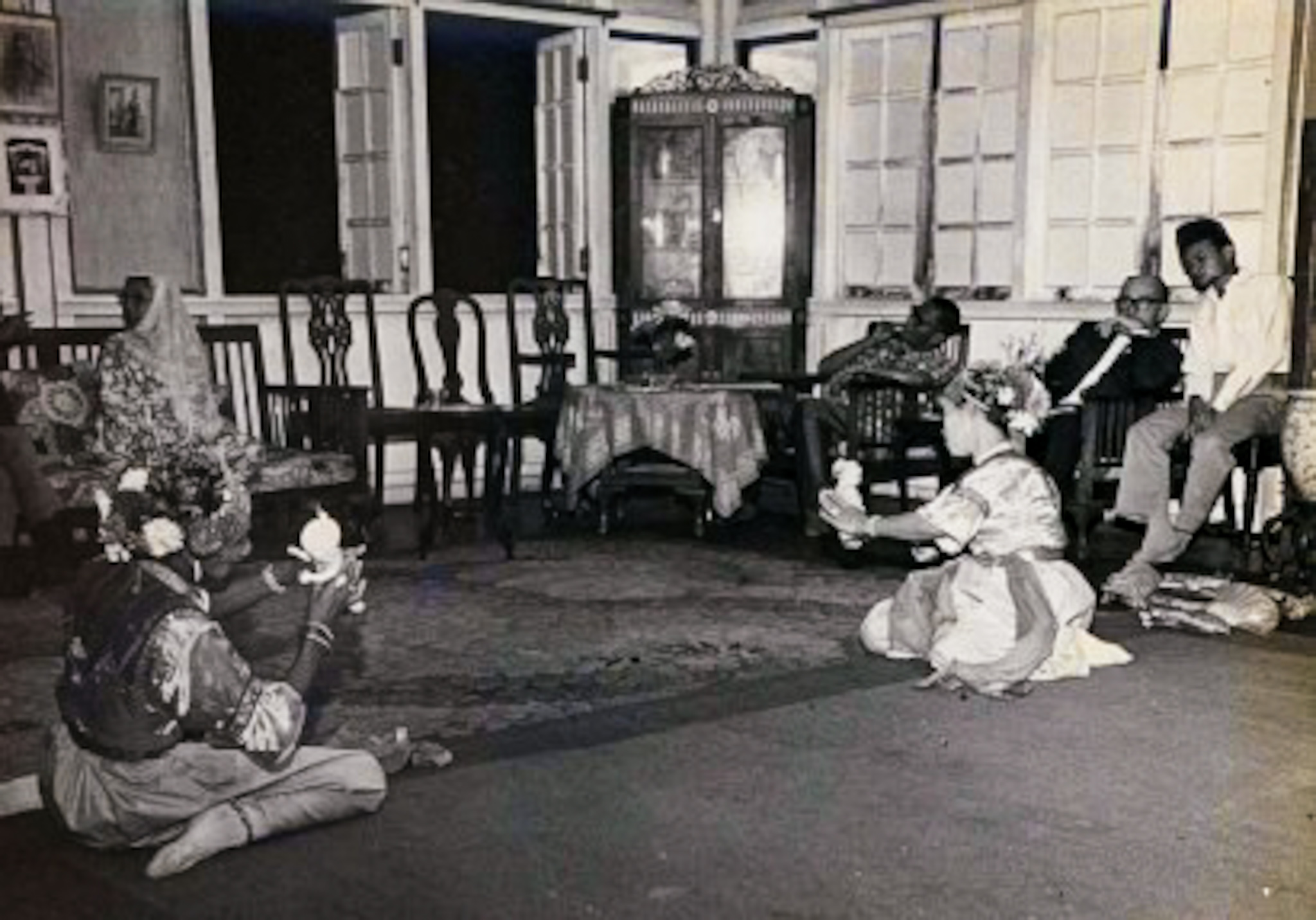
Performance of Geliong at Istana Kolam, Terengganu, in 1967

A significant milestone was reached in 1994 when Malay gamelan was incorporated into the curriculum of the Akademi Seni Kebangsaan, later the National Academy of Arts, Culture and Heritage (ASWARA). Together with programmes at Universiti Malaya, Universiti Kebangsaan Malaysia and other institutions, this development established Malay gamelan as part of formal arts education in Malaysia and contributed to the emergence of new generations of performers, educators and researchers.

By the end of the twentieth century, Malay gamelan had become firmly established within Malaysia's cultural and educational landscape. Although several ensembles associated with the early revival period later ceased operation, institutional support ensured the continued transmission of the tradition through teaching, research, documentation and public performance. Today, Malay gamelan remains an important component of Malaysia's performing arts heritage and continues to be practised in both artistic and academic contexts.

== Repertoire ==
=== Instrument ===
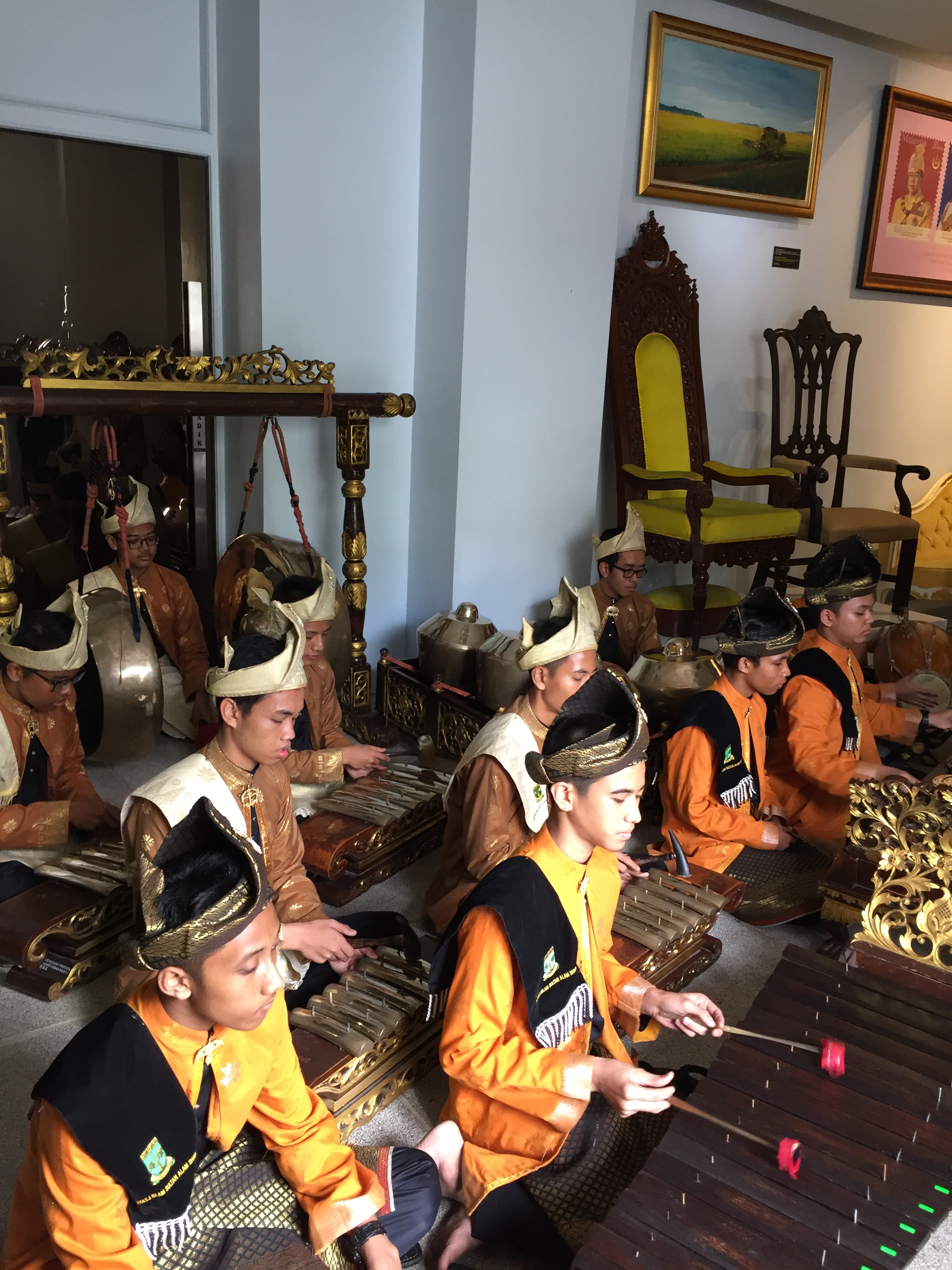
A Malay gamelan ensemble from Sultan Alam Shah Islamic College performing at Sultan Abdul Aziz Royal Gallery, Klang, in 2019.

The standard Malay gamelan ensemble is based on the royal gamelan set formerly preserved at Istana Kolam, Terengganu and transferred to Pahang in 1973. The set, now housed at the Sultan Abu Bakar Museum, comprises the keromong (bonang), gambang, saron kecil, saron besar, gendang, three kenong and a pair of hanging gongs. Although smaller than many Central Javanese and Balinese gamelan ensembles, these instruments provide the complete melodic, structural and rhythmic framework characteristic of Malay gamelan performance.

Following classifications commonly applied in gamelan studies, the instruments may be grouped according to their musical functions. The keromong, gambang, saron kecil and saron besar carry the principal melodic material; the gendang regulates tempo and transitions; while the kenong and hanging gongs articulate the formal structure of a composition and mark important musical divisions. Together, these instruments produce the layered texture that characterises Malay gamelan music.

Instruments of the Malay gamelan ensemble
Instrument	Description	Musical function
Keromong (Bonang Barung)	Set of ten small kettle gongs mounted horizontally	Principal melodic instrument
Gambang	Wooden xylophone	Melodic elaboration
Saron kecil (Saron Barung)	Medium-sized metallophone	Melodic framework
Saron besar (Saron Demung)	Larger metallophone with lower register	Melodic framework
Gendang	Double-headed drum	Controls tempo and transitions
Kenong	Set of three large kettle gongs	Marks structural divisions
Gong kecil	Hanging gong	Structural punctuation
Gong besar	Large hanging gong	Marks major phrase endings

=== Musical repertoire ===
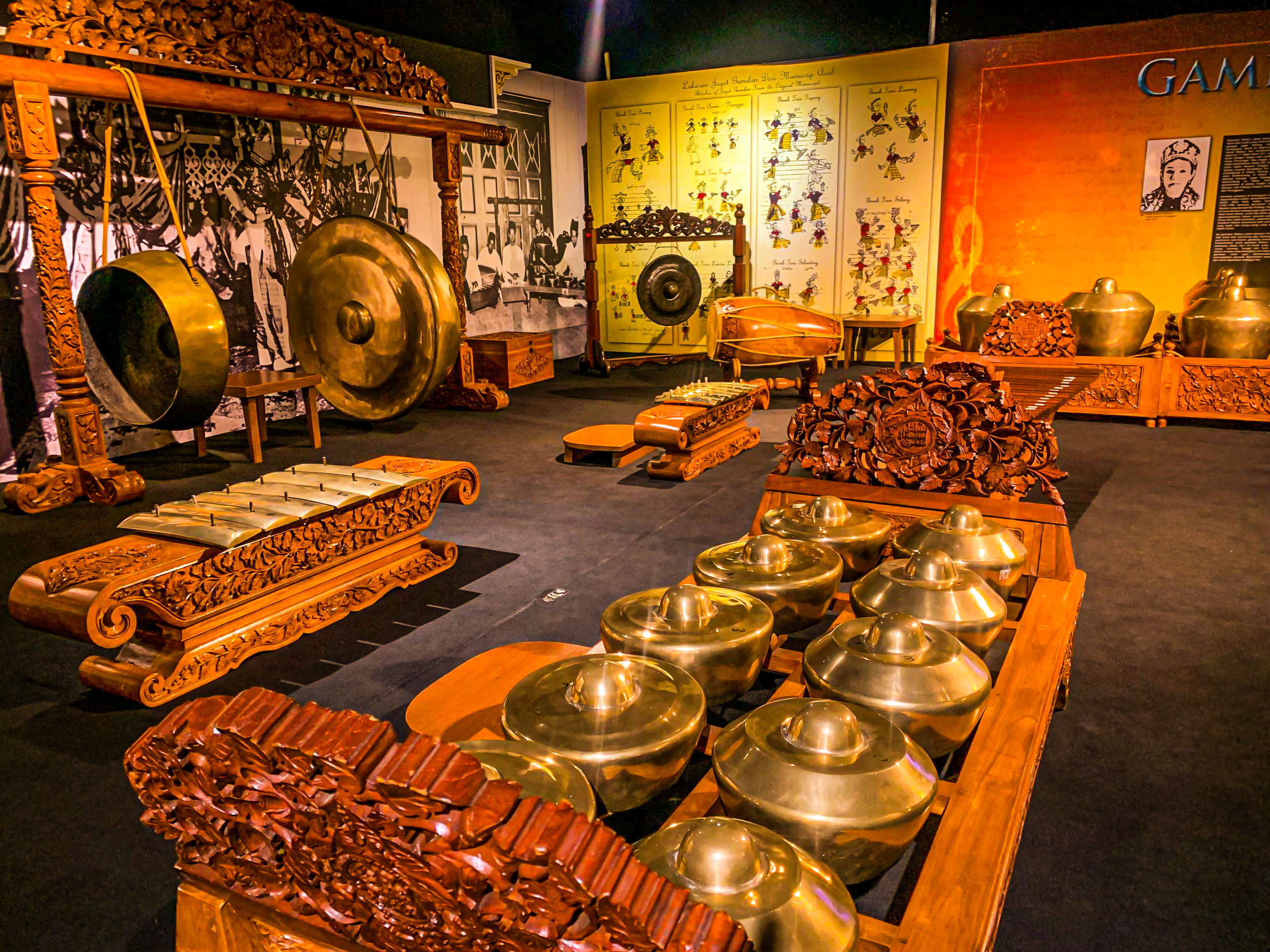
A Malay gamelan collection displayed at the Music Museum, Kuala Lumpur

The repertoire of Malay gamelan consists primarily of instrumental compositions performed in conjunction with court dances and ceremonial occasions. Unlike many Javanese gamelan traditions, which are closely associated with theatrical forms such as wayang and ketoprak, the Malay repertoire developed within the context of palace entertainment, court ceremony and dance performance. Many compositions are associated with narratives derived from the Panji cycle, a corpus of courtly romances that spread widely across maritime Southeast Asia and became incorporated into Malay court culture.

A number of compositions are linked to specific characters, episodes, or symbolic themes. Timang Burung, one of the best-known pieces in the repertoire, is associated with Raden Galoh Cendera Kirana and her beloved bird, while Ayak-Ayak relates to preparations for a royal feast. Perang traditionally accompanied scenes of combat in dance performances, whereas compositions such as Ketam Renjung and Togok draw inspiration from the movements of animals and birds. Other pieces, including Bujang Emas, Gambuh and Geliong, are similarly connected to episodes involving Panji characters, royal courts and courtly romance.

== Performance practice ==
=== Dance repertoire ===
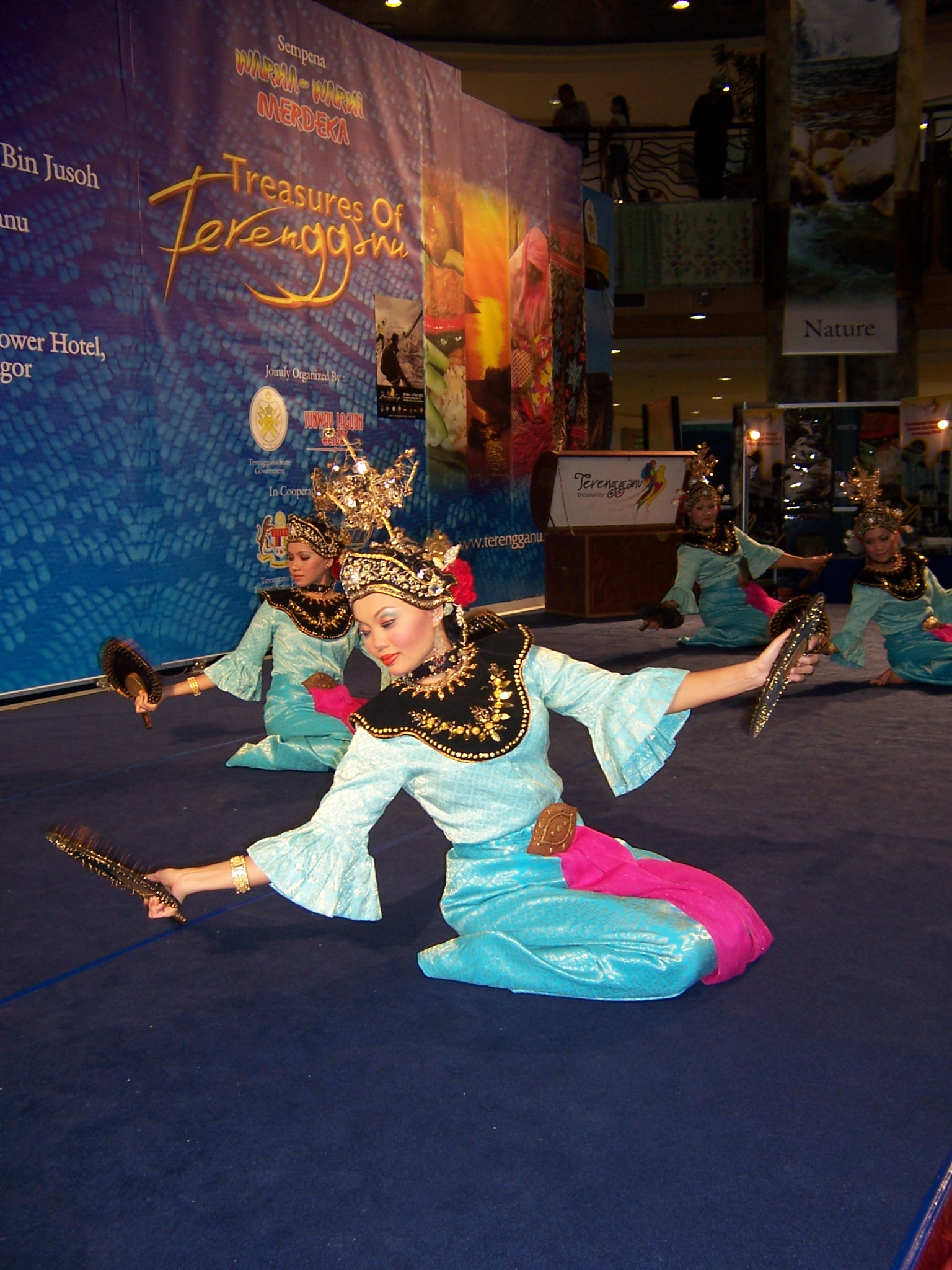
A Joget Gamelan dancer in full traditional costume during the Treasures of Terengganu cultural event.

Malay gamelan is closely associated with a repertoire of court dances collectively known as Joget Gamelan. Many of these dances draw upon narratives derived from the Panji cycle and other courtly stories, while others emphasise stylised movement and courtly aesthetics rather than explicit storytelling. Traditionally, individual dances could be performed independently or incorporated into larger dance-dramas adapted from literary works such as Syair Siti Zubaidah Perang China.

Contemporary accounts of palace performances in the early twentieth century also record occasional instances in which dancers entered trance-like states during extended performances. Such episodes were sometimes interpreted locally as cases of spirit possession, particularly during performances held late into the night.

Seven dances are commonly regarded as the core surviving repertoire of the tradition. Topeng is associated with the ceremonial reception of warriors returning from battle, while Timang Burung depicts the movements of a favourite bird belonging to Raden Galoh Cendera Kirana, a principal character in the Panji stories. Togok, named after a character from Hikayat Panji Semerang, similarly incorporates avian-inspired movements. Ayak-Ayak differs from these narrative dances in that it emphasises the aesthetic qualities of movement rather than a specific storyline.

Other dances portray scenes from courtly life and literary narratives. Lambang Sari depicts a group of princesses engaged in activities such as bathing, grooming and recreation in a palace garden. Perang Manggung presents a stylised combat sequence derived from episodes in the Panji tradition, while Geliong recounts the exchange of a royal infant with the child of a minister, a theme found in traditional court narratives. Together, these dances form the core choreographic repertoire of Malay gamelan and remain central to contemporary performances of the tradition.

=== Costume and adornment ===
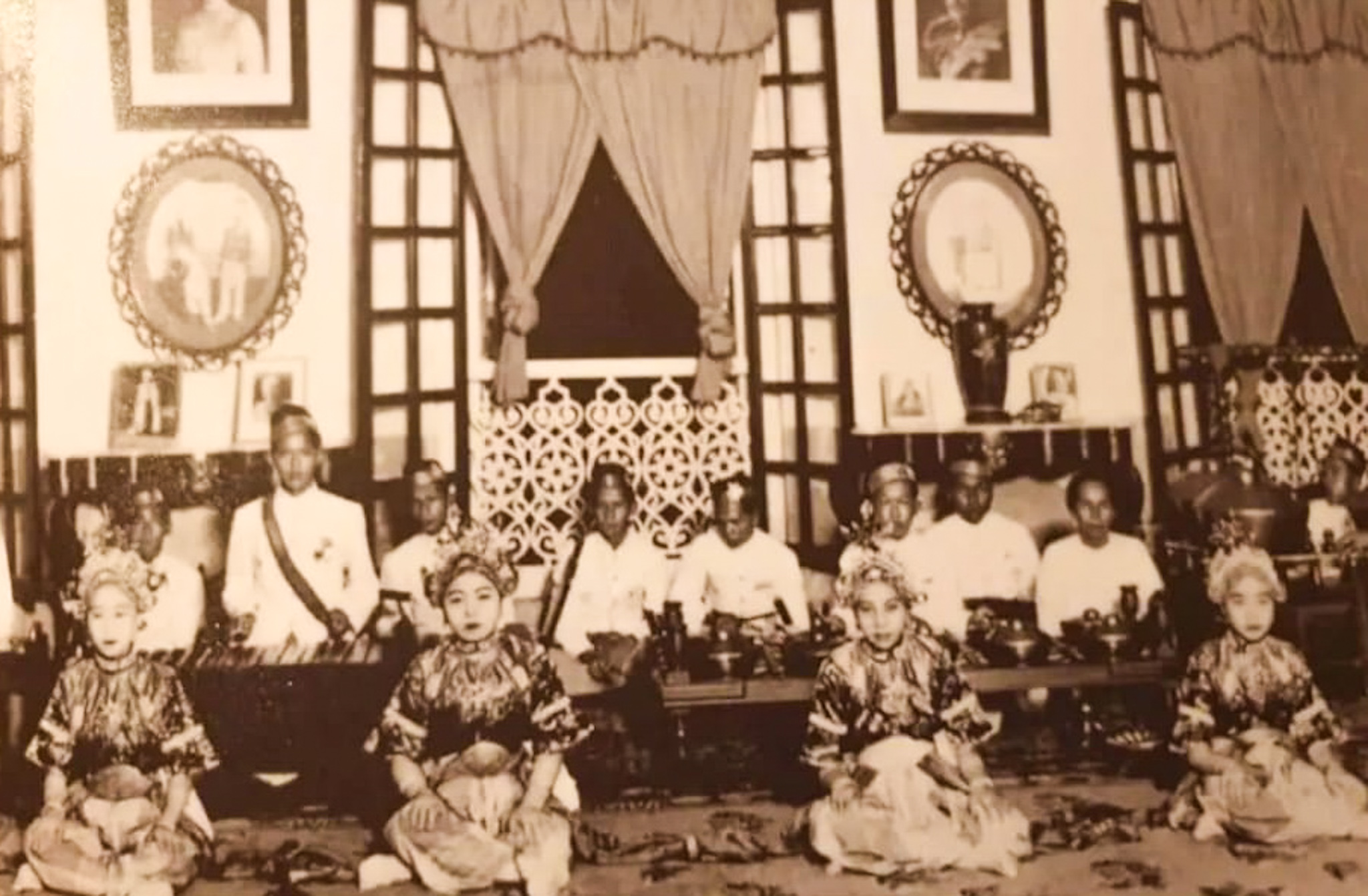
Joget Gamelan dancers in court costume accompanied by a gamelan ensemble, c. 1930s.

The costume worn in Malay gamelan performances reflects the court dress traditions from which the dance repertoire developed. Female dancers typically wear a fitted blouse with either elbow-length ruffled sleeves or long sleeves, paired with a sarong, often made from silk, brocade, or songket. The costume is designed to evoke the appearance of palace attire and forms an important element of the visual presentation of Joget Gamelan.

Performers are also adorned with a range of decorative accessories associated with court aesthetics. These include head ornaments such as the gerak gempa, gandik, bunga tajuk and gayut tengkuk, together with jewellery worn around the neck and waist. Many of these adornments are embellished with sequins and metallic decoration, contributing to the formal appearance of the dancers. Historically, some accessories were made by the performers themselves using materials such as brocade, although they are now generally produced by specialist craftspeople.

Adornment
Accessory	Description
Gerak gempa	Five-petalled floral head ornament
Gandik	Forehead ornament worn above the brow
Bunga tajuk	Decorative ornament attached to the hair bun
Gayut tengkuk	Ornament suspended at the back of the neck below the bun
Cekak leher	Necklace or neck ornament
Bengkung and pending	Decorative waist belt and clasp

=== Ritual and performance conventions ===
Traditional Malay gamelan performance is governed by a set of court-derived conventions reflecting its origins within the royal palaces of Pahang and Terengganu. Particular respect is accorded to the instruments, which historically formed part of the ceremonial culture of the court and were treated in accordance with established palace etiquette. Among practitioners, this included customs relating to the handling, placement and movement of instruments during rehearsals and performances.

Similar conventions apply to dance performance. Dancers traditionally wear costumes and accessories derived from court attire and performances are generally expected to follow established choreographic and ceremonial practices. One of the most characteristic elements is the angkat sembah gesture, which traditionally marks both the opening and conclusion of a performance. The form of the gesture may vary according to the performance context, reflecting distinctions between palace ceremonies and public presentations.

== Cultural context and heritage status ==
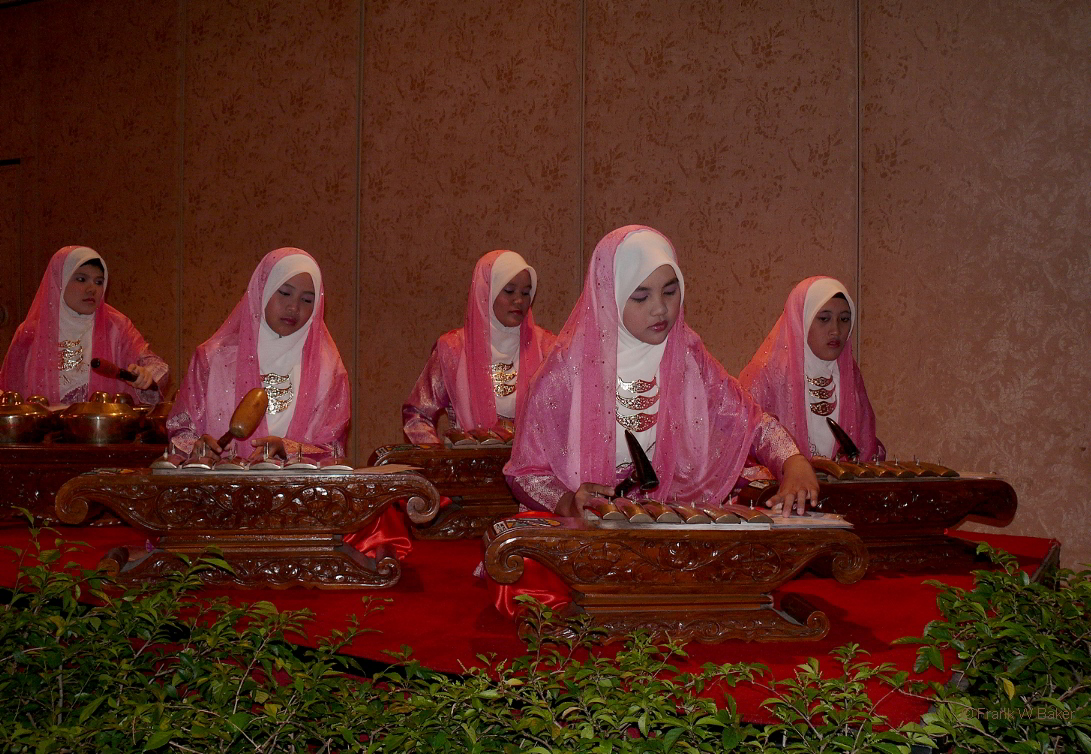
Female musicians performing Malay gamelan

In Malay court culture, gamelan formed part of a broader ceremonial performance system in which music, dance, costume and court etiquette functioned as an integrated whole. In royal weddings and state ceremonies, gamelan accompanied joget gamelan performances by dancers in court dress, contributing to the formalisation and symbolic stature of such occasions.

Malay gamelan was recognised as a National Heritage item of Malaysia when it was entered into the National Heritage Register in 2009 under the category of intangible cultural heritage. The designation followed an evaluation conducted by the Department of National Heritage in accordance with the provisions of the National Heritage Act 2005 (Act 645), which provides a legal framework for the identification, protection and management of nationally significant cultural heritage.

The recognition reflects the historical importance of Malay gamelan as a court-based performing arts tradition and its significance within Malaysia's cultural heritage. Since its inclusion in the National Heritage Register, the tradition has been supported through documentation, research, education and performance initiatives undertaken by cultural institutions, universities and heritage organisations.

In 2025, Malaysia's Minister of Tourism, Arts and Culture, Tiong King Sing, expressed support for Malaysian participation in initiatives related to UNESCO's inscription of gamelan, describing it as a shared cultural heritage of the region and emphasising continued cultural cooperation between Malaysia and Indonesia in its preservation and promotion.

== See also ==
- Gamelan
- Gamelan outside Indonesia
