= Mak yong =

Traditional Malay dance drama

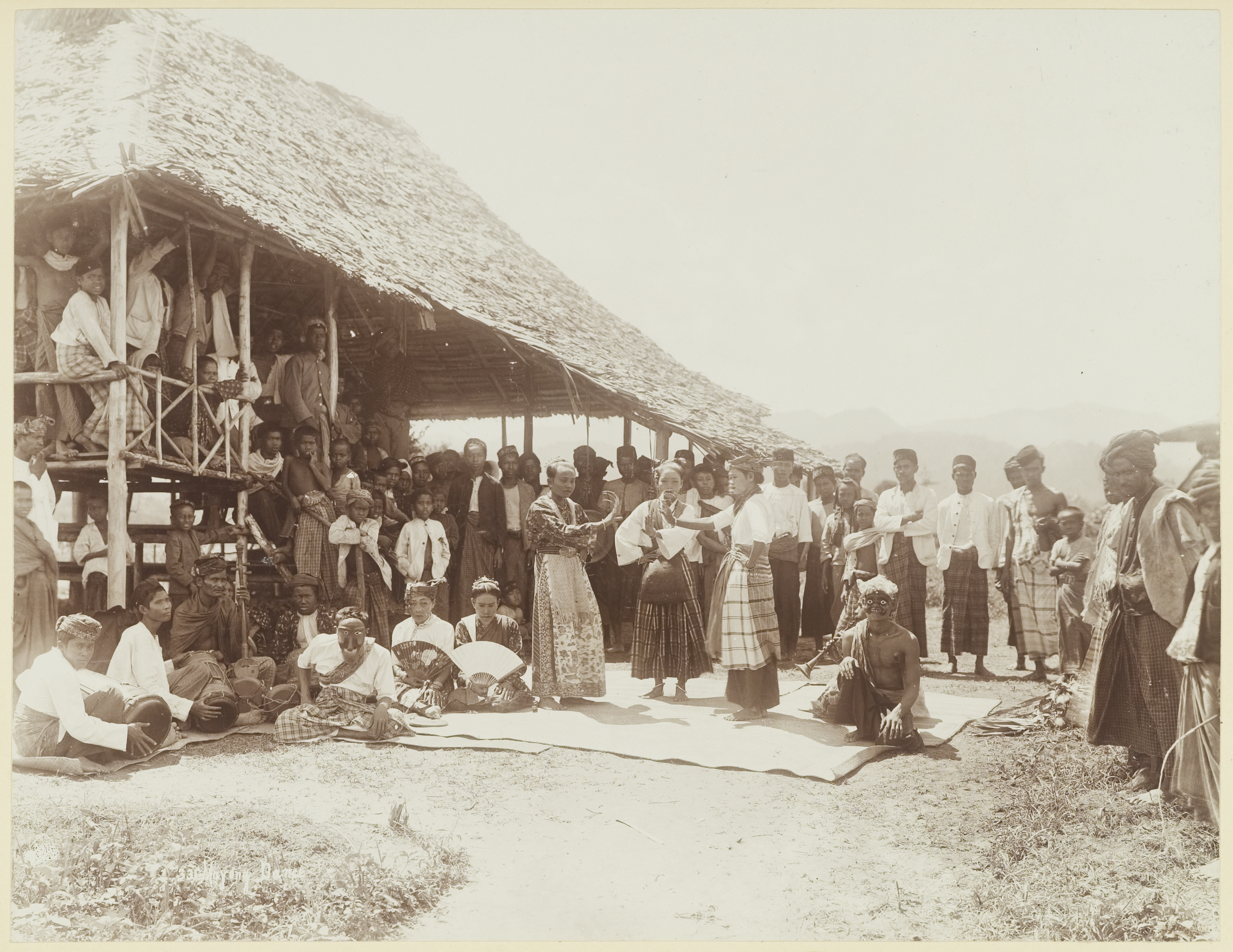
- Mak yong dance and drama at Penang, c.1903
- Native name: Tarian Mak Yong
- Origin: Kelantan and Pattani (in present day Malaysia and Thailand)

Mak Yong Theatre
- UNESCO Intangible Cultural Heritage
- Country: Malaysia
- Reference: 00167
- Region: Asia and the Pacific

Inscription history
- Inscription: 2008 (3rd session)
- List: Representative

Mak yong (Jawi: مق يوڠ pronounced [ˈmaʔ joŋ]; Thai: มะโย่ง, RTGS: ma yong) is a traditional form of dance theatre practiced among the Malays particularly in Kelantan, Terengganu (both in modern day Malaysia), Yala and Pattani (both in modern day Thailand) north of the Malay Peninsula, islands Batam and Bintan (modern day Indonesia) down south via Singapore, as well as Riau and North Sumatra.

Although most traditional Malay dances were influenced by India, Java, and other parts of Southeast Asia, mak yong's singing and musical repertoire are unique to the region. Of the major stories performed in mak yong, most are derived from Kelantan or Patani mythology. Some of those obtained from outside the Malayan–Thai region have now died out elsewhere, such as "Anak Raja Gondang", a story originally from Buddhist Jakata tales but now almost unknown in India. On the Kelantan side, it was deemed religiously transgressive to the ruling state government helmed by the conservative Pan-Malaysian Islamic Party because of its animist and Hindu-Buddhist origins, but the ban was uplifted in 2019.

A traditional performance (at least in the past) begins by placing an offering (semah kampung) to placate and pay respect sometimes to spirits, sometimes in homage to previous performers. This is followed by dancing, acting, and improvised dialogues. Stories were presented in a series of three-hour performances over several nights. The lead dancer is called the Pak Yong and dresses like a king. The cast usually includes a queen in second lead, palace girls, and jesters. Traditionally, all performers were female except for the clowns who are always male. A group called Jong Dongdang sings and dances in between chapters and at the story's closing. The mak yong orchestra is small with the main instruments played being the rebab, a three-stringed spiked lute, drums (gendang), and a pair of gongs. It may also include the flute (serunai), keduk drums and small cymbals (kesi).

Today there is less than ten veteran mak yong performers. Although there have been a few attempts to revive the art form, seasoned performers have noted a clear difference between the commercialized mak yong of urban dancers when compared with the movements of rural performers. Not many young people are willing to undergo the rigorous apprenticeship so the art is now on the decline. The late Cik Ning was a leading mak yong performer in the 1980s. In 2005, UNESCO declared mak yong theatre one of the Masterpieces of the Oral and Intangible Heritage of Humanity.

== History ==
Mak yong was originally a form of folk theatre involving rituals connected with propitiation as well as healing. It is believed to have come into being in the Pattani Kingdom, now a province of Thailand. Because it was passed down orally among villagers, mak yong's exact age is uncertain. However, the fact that it is mostly free of outside influence would make it 800 years old at the very least and almost certainly much older. Legend generally credits the dance to a figure called Mak Hiang; Mubin Sheppard theorized it was a rice spirit (semangat padi), to which ethnographer Ghulam-Sarwar Yousof disputes the connection. Nevertheless, there is a link to Malay pre-Islamic native animism through processes like the mengadap rebab. Certain observers connected mak yong with the palace, especially in Patani, but there is no evidence for this. It was patronized by all layers of society to pay respect to spirits, give thanks for the harvest, or to cure a person of various illnesses.

Mak yong was brought to Kelantan more than 200 years ago. From there, it also spread to Kedah and existed as folk theatre. From the 1920s, some support was given to mak yong in Kelantan and attempts were made to refine it. In 1923, the sultan's youngest son, Long Abdul Ghaffar, was in favour of mak yong and built a cultural precinct called Kampung Temenggung on his palace grounds to lend his support to the arts. During this time, it became conventional to have a lead female. His death in 1935 was followed by World War II. Mak yong once again became a folk tradition. In the 1970s, an attempt was made to create a refined version of mak yong, supposedly carrying on the efforts of Long Abdul Ghaffar. For this purpose, a group called Seri Temenggong was established under Khatijah Awang. Performances were done in major towns and cities, and mak yong also found a place in academic institutions.

The traditional mak yong continued into the 1960s and 1970s in which Islamic revitalism had reached Malaysia by then; When PAS took control of Kelantan's state government in 1991 following the previous year's state election, they banned mak yong for its "un-Islamic elements" and clothing, which leaves women's heads and arms uncovered. Although many old performers defied the ban, mak yong could no longer be shown in public. Some thought the tradition would die out until UNESCO declared it as one of the intangible cultural heritages that should be preserved. In 2019, deputy Chief Minister Mohd Amar Abdullah on conditions that the performances should be secularised of any perceived extra-Muslim religious elements as well as keeping audiences segregated by gender. There has since been some effort to perform mak yong outside Kelantan but interest among the younger generation is lacking.

Nowadays, mak yong is seldom performed as priority is often given to modern group dances like joget; though it is sometimes still staged to mark state events as well as for tourists. However, these modern shortened performances are stripped of the old animist rituals and their music is simplified because the songs are played so infrequently. There are only a few troupes left who perform traditionally mak yong in the villages of Kelantan and Terengganu.

== Ritual performance ==
As with many other ancient Malay forms of theatre, mak yong was once used for healing purposes. Healing mak yong is called mak yong mak puteri and involves trance dancing and spirit possession through the use of the traditional healing ritual called main puteri. These healing rituals are still practiced in the villages as well as in some more traditional cities but they are largely frowned upon today.

Ritual performances are more elaborate than those staged for entertainment, combining shamanism, feasting the spirits, and dance theatre. It reflects the deep, mystical significance of mak yong's stories and dances and its original aim to serve as a conduit to the spirit world. Ritual performances are enacted for spiritual healing, to pay homage to a teacher and for the graduation of a performer.

== See also ==
- Bangsawan
- Menora
- Dikir barat
- Kuda Kepang
- Reog
- Sanghyang
- Wayang
- Ulek mayang
