= Johor-Riau =

Johor-Riau may refer to:

Johor-Riau-Lingga-Pahang; a former Malay sultanate that partitioned into 2 following the Anglo Dutch Treaty in 1824:

- Johor Sultanate, the Johor mainland and its dependencies in Pahang
- Riau Sultanate, the Riau archipelago and its dependencies in Lingga

In linguistics, Johor–Riau Malay is a form of the Malaysian and Indonesian languages. Both Standard Malay and Standard Indonesian are based on the Johor–Riau dialect of Malay.
