= Mubin Sheppard =

Malaysian civil servant and historian

Yang Berbahagia Tan Sri Dato' Mubin Sheppard PSM DPMS JMN CMG MBE OStJ
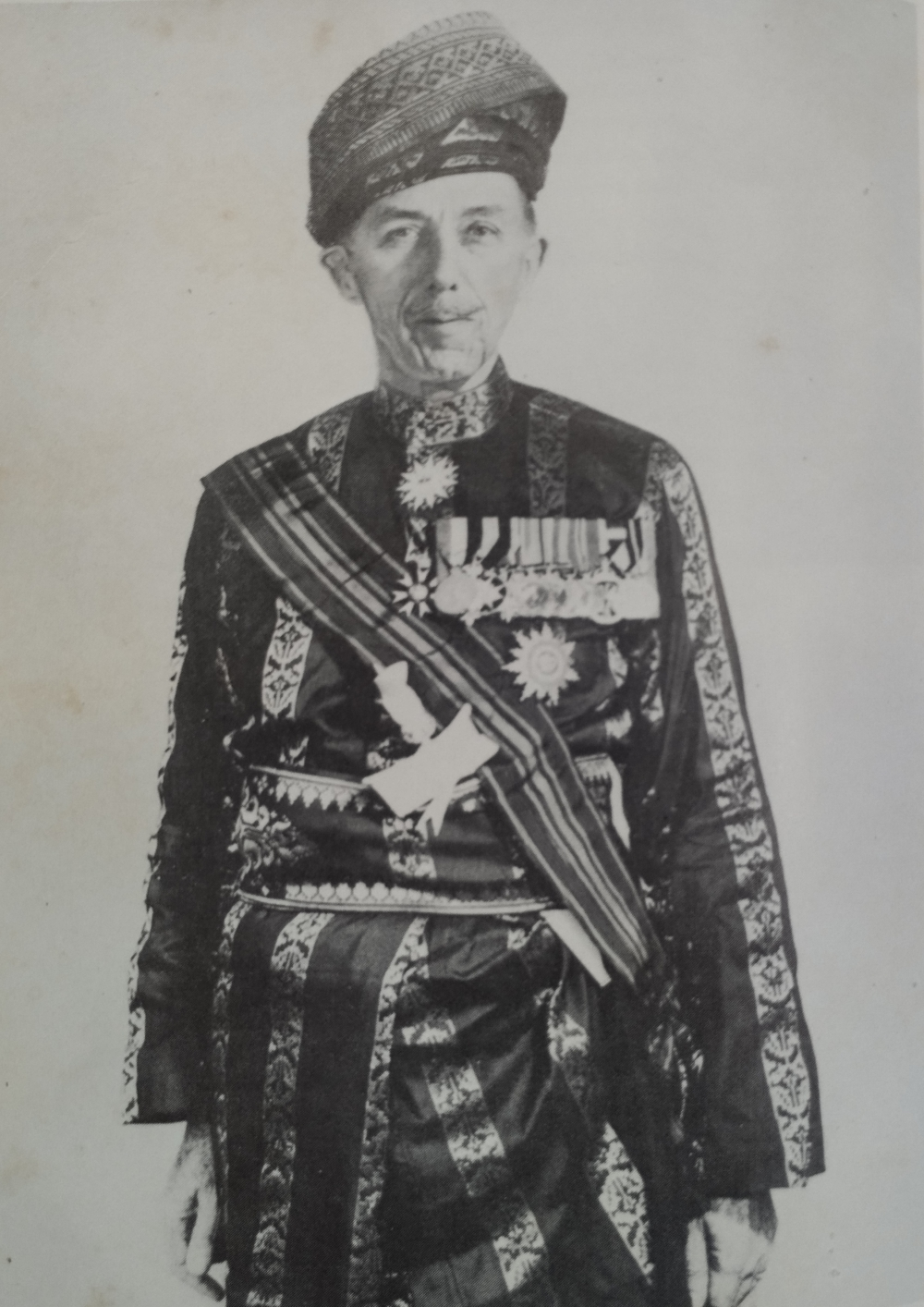
- Tan Sri Mubin Sheppard pictured at Istana Negara in October 1969 after receiving the "Panglima Setia Mahkota" honor.
- Born: Mervyn Cecil ffrank Sheppard; 21 June 1905; Ireland
- Died: 12 September 1994 (aged 89); Subang Jaya, Selangor, Malaysia
- Burial place: Jalan Ampang Muslim Cemetery
- Citizenship: British (before 1958); Malaya (1958-1963); Malaysia (after 1963)
- Education: Marlborough College; Magdalene College, Cambridge University
- Occupations: Military officer; civil servant; museum director; historian; academic
- Organization: Malaysian Branch of the Royal Asiatic Society
- Known for: Historian
- Notable work: The Malay Regiment 1933–1947 (1978); The Adventures of Hang Tuah (1984); A Short History of Terengganu (1949)
- Style: Historical
- Title: First Keeper of Public Records
- Spouse(s): Rosemary Sheppard (née Oakeley), Tengku Mariam Tengku Ismail
- Children: Lavender Frances Sheppard
- Awards: Commander of the Order of Loyalty to the Crown of Malaysia; Companion of the Order of the Defender of the Realm; Companion of The Most Distinguished Order of Saint Michael and Saint George; Member of the Most Excellent Order of the British Empire; Officer of the Order of Saint John
- Military career
- Allegiance: Allied forces
- Branch: Volunteer Reserves
- Service years: 1941–1945
- Rank: Major
- Unit: Federated Malay States Volunteer Force
- Commands: 1st Battalion, Federated Malay States Volunteer Forces
- Conflicts: World War II: Malayan campaign

Abdul Mubin Sheppard PSM DPMS JMN CMG MBE OStJ, born Mervyn Cecil ffrank Sheppard, pen name M. C. ff Sheppard, (21 June 1905 – 11 September 1994) was a Malaysian World War II veteran and prisoner of war, as well as a renowned historian and academic.

== Life ==
=== Early life ===
Mervyn Sheppard was born in Ireland on June 21, 1905 to a Christian family, was raised in England. He received his early education at Marlborough College before continuing on to Magdalene College, Cambridge, a constituent college of the Cambridge University. He joined the Malayan Civil Services (MCS) in 1928, a year after passing his qualification exam in London. During his time there, he developed a strong attachment to the country and its people. He married Rosemary Oakeley in Singapore's St Andrew's Cathedral on 27 January 1939. Lavender, their daughter and his only child, was born in October 1941. Their union lasted until their deaths.

=== World War II ===
From 1941 to 1942, he served as a Company Commander in the 1st Battalion, Federated Malay States Volunteer Force (FMSVF), earning the rank of captain and becoming a prisoner of war during WWII. In 1945, he retired as a major from the FMSVF.

=== Post-WWII ===
He chose to remain in the civil service until his total retirement in 1963. He founded the Malayan Film Unit in 1946, the predecessor of the now Filem Negara Malaysia. He converted to Islam in 1957, adopting the name Abdul Mubin Sheppard and performing the Hajj in 1960.

In 1958, he was appointed as the first Keeper of Public Records, an office that would eventually become the Arkib Negara, or National Archives. He was also granted Malayan citizenship on 15 January of the same year.

In 1959, he became the first director of the then-Federation of Malaya's own national museum, where he assembled a team tasked with retrieving Malayan artefacts from cities such as Lisbon and London to be displayed there. Mubin commissioned British artist Waveney Jenkins to make a bas relief of the legendary warrior Hang Tuah for permanent display in the National Museum in 1962.

=== Death ===
He died on 11 September 1994 at the Subang Jaya Medical Centre in Subang Jaya, Selangor. He was buried in Jalan Ampang Muslim Cemetery with military traditions and national honours.

== Careers ==
Sheppard's careers include:

- Malayan Civil Services Intern (February 1942–September 1945)
- Director of Public Relations (1946–1947)
- Kelantan's Acting British Adviser (1950–1951)
- Negeri Sembilan's British Adviser (1951–1956)
- Federal Chief Examiner for Bahasa Melayu (1951–1957)
- Head of Emergency Food Denial Organisation (1956–1957)
- Keeper of Public Records (1957–1961)
- Director of Museum, Federation of Malaya (1958–1963)

Among his other positions are:

- Founder of the Malaysian Federation of Arts Councils
- Vice President of Malaysian Branch of the Royal Asiatic Society
- Malayan Historical Society's Honorary Editor
- Malaya Muslim Warfare Organisation's Honorary Secretary General
- Honorary Treasurer of the National Art Gallery's Board of Trustees

== Legacy ==
The Mubin Sheppard Memorial Prize was established under his name in 1996 by the Malaysia Heritage Trust to stimulate students' awareness of "the need to conserve Malaysia's built heritage and to encourage research and writings on various aspects of conservation and preservation".

He was the founding father of the Malaya Association of Youth Clubs (EST. 1954), a youth association inspired by the National Association of Boys' Club.

== Honours ==
Among the honours and awards he has received including:

=== Honours of the United Kingdom ===
- United Kingdom
  - Member of the Order of the British Empire (MBE) (1946)

=== Honours of Malaysia ===
==== Federal honours ====
- Malaysia
  - Companion of the Order of the Defender of the Realm (JMN) (1963)
  - Commander of the Order of Loyalty to the Crown of Malaysia (PSM) - Tan Sri (1969)

==== Malaysian State honours ====
- Negeri Sembilan
  - He was awarded a title of Dato' Jasa Purba Diraja (transl. Royal Historian) by the Yang di-Pertuan Besar of Negeri Sembilan for his services as a historian. - Dato'
- Selangor
  - Knight Commander of the Order of the Crown of Selangor (DPMS) – Dato' (1982)

== Bibliography ==
His works include:

- Tunku Abdul Rahman; Father of Independence 1957–1970
- The Adventures of Hang Tuah (1949)
- A Short History of Terengganu (1949)
- A Short History of Malaya (1953)
- Taman Indera: A Royal Pleasure Ground. Malay Decorative Arts and Pastimes (1972) ISBN 019582685X
- The Malay Regiment 1933–1947 (1978)
- Living Crafts of Malaysia (1978)
- Taman budiman: Memoirs of an unorthodox civil servant (1979)
- Singapore 150 Years (1982) ISBN 9971-65-092-4
- Tunku, a pictorial biography, 1903–1957 (1984) ISBN 9679780023
