= Peranakan Chinese =

Chinese-descended ethnic group of Southeast Asia

峇峇娘惹 Baba Nyonya Baba Yaya
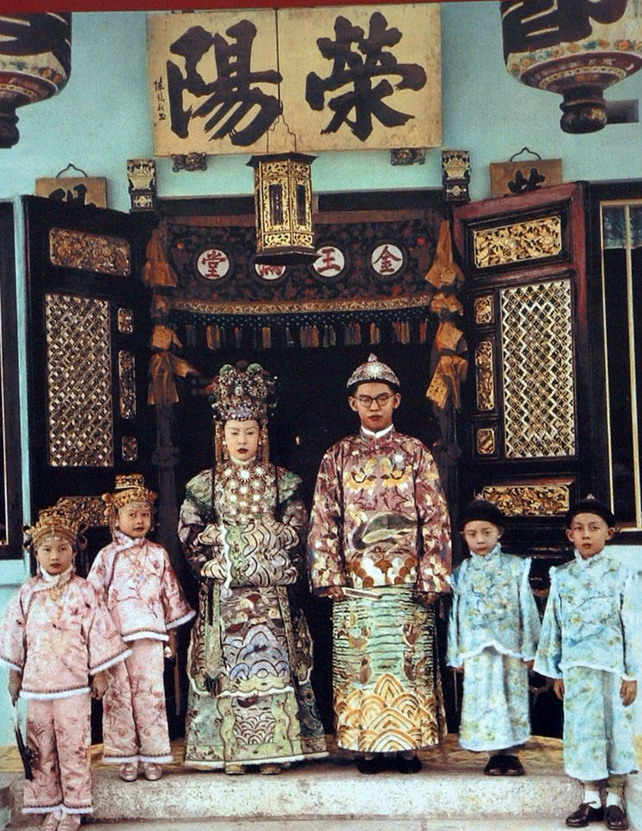
- A photograph of Peranakan wedding couple – Chung Guat Hooi, the daughter of Kapitan Chung Thye Phin and Khoo Soo Beow, the son of Khoo Heng Pan, both of Penang – from a museum in Penang

Total population
- 8,000,000+ (estimates)

Regions with significant populations
- Indonesia, Malaysia, Singapore, Southern Thailand

Languages
- Baba Malay and other varieties of Malay, Penang Hokkien, Singaporean Hokkien, and other varieties of Chinese, Indonesian, Sundanese, Javanese, Betawi, Southern Thai, English, Singlish, Dutch

Religion
- Majority: Buddhism, Christianity, Confucianism, Taoism; Minority: Sunni Islam and Other religions

Related ethnic groups
- Chinese diaspora, Benteng, Bangka Island Peranakan Chinese, Cina Kampung, Sino-Natives, Malaysian Chinese, Thai Chinese, Chinese Singaporeans, Chinese Indonesians (Chindo), Sri Lankan Malays, Filipino Chinese

Peranakan Chinese

Chinese name
- Chinese: 峇峇娘惹
Transcriptions
Standard Mandarin
- Hanyu Pinyin: Bābā-niángrě
Southern Min
- Hokkien POJ: Bā-bā-nō͘-niâ

Thai name
- Thai: Baba Yaya / Baba Phuket

Malay name
- Malay: Baba Nyonya / Cina Peranakan / Cina Selat

The Peranakan Chinese (/pəˈrɑːnəˌkɑːn, -kən/) are an ethnic group defined by their genealogical descent from the first waves of Southern Chinese settlers who intermarried with local communities across maritime Southeast Asia, known as Nanyang (Chinese: 南洋; pinyin: nán yáng; lit. 'Southern Ocean'), namely the British, Portuguese, and Dutch colonial ports in the Malay Peninsula and the Indonesian Archipelago, as well as Singapore. The Peranakan Chinese are often simply referred to as the Peranakans. (Note: "The Peranakan Chinese, however, form the largest and the most important group, and for this reason many scholars use Peranakan to refer specifically to the Chinese group.") Peranakan culture is characterised by its unique hybridisation of ancient Chinese culture with the local cultures of the Nusantara region, the result of a centuries-long history of transculturation and interracial marriage.

Immigrants from the southern provinces of China arrived in significant numbers in the region between the 14th and early 18th centuries, taking abode in the Malay Peninsula (where their descendants in Malacca, Singapore and Penang are referred to as Baba–Nyonya); northern Java in modern-day Indonesia; Southern Thailand (where their descendants are referred to as Baba-Yaya); Terengganu (where their descendants are referred to as Cheng Mua Lang); and North Borneo (where their descendants in Sabah are also referred to as Sino-Natives). Intermarriage between these Chinese settlers and their Malay, Thai, Javanese, or other predecessors in the region contributed to the emergence of a distinctive hybrid culture and ostensible phenotypic differences. Through colonisation of the region, the impact and presence of the Peranakan Chinese spread beyond Nusantara. In Sri Lanka, the Peranakan Chinese went on to contribute to the development of the Sri Lankan Malay identity that emerged in the nation during Dutch rule.

The Peranakans are considered a multiracial community, with the caveat that individual family histories vary widely and likewise self-identification with multiracialism as opposed to Chineseness varies widely. The Malay/Indonesian phrase "orang Cina bukan Cina" ("a not-Chinese Chinese person") encapsulates the complex relationship between Peranakan identity and Chinese identity. The particularities of genealogy and the unique syncretic culture are the main features that distinguish the Peranakan from descendants of later waves of Chinese immigrants to the region.

== Etymology ==
The word Peranakan is a morphological derivation of the Malay and Indonesian word anak, meaning child or offspring. With the addition of the prefix per- and the suffix -an to the root anak, the modified word peranakan has a variety of meanings. Among other things, it can mean womb, or it can be used as a designator of genealogical descent, connoting ancestry or lineage, including great-grandparents or more-distant ancestors. On its own, when used in common parlance, the word "peranakan" does not denote a specific ethnicity of descent unless followed by a subsequent qualifying noun. For example Peranakan Tionghoa/Cina may simply mean "Chinese descendants"; likewise Jawi Peranakan can mean "Arab descendants", or Peranakan Belanda "Dutch descendants".

However, in a semantic shift, the word peranakan has come to be used as a "metaphorical" adjective that has the meaning of "locally born but non-indigenous". In Indonesian, it can denote "hybrid" or "crossbred". Thus the term "Peranakan Cina" or "Peranakan Tionghoa" can have the literal or archaic meaning of "Chinese womb" or "Chinese descendants" or "Chinese ancestry" or "descended from the Chinese"—but more latterly has come to mean "locally born but non-indigenous Chinese" or even "half-caste Chinese". The semantic shift is presumed to have arisen from the thorough hybridisation or assimilation of the earliest Chinese or other non-indigenous settlers in the Malay Archipelago such that their ethnic heritage needed to be specified whenever referring to them, either to avoid confusion or to emphasise difference. The designator peranakan—in its original sense simply connoting "descendant of X ethnicity", or "the wombs of X"—emerged as the name for entire ethnic groups that were "locally born but non-indigenous" or perceived to be "hybrid" and "crossbred", and, in time, the latter meaning has come to predominate. It should also be noted that the broadness of the semantic range of peranakan means that it can have significantly different connotations in different parts of the Nusantara region and across different dialects or variants of the Malay and Indonesian languages.

The word Peranakan, which can have very broad and labile meanings in Malay and Indonesian and, when used in common parlance, is simply an indicator of heritage or descent, may also be used to refer to other ethnic groups in the same region. Owing to the broad meaning of the term 'peranakan', the term is also encountered when referring to other communities in the region with similar histories of immigration and assimilation. For example, the Chitty may accurately refer to themselves as 'Indian Hindu Peranakans', meaning "of Indian Hindu descent" or "locally born but non-indigenous Indian Hindu". Likewise the Kristang may accurately refer to themselves as 'Eurasian Peranakans'. The name of the Jawi Pekan people is derived from 'Peranakan', Jawi being the Javanised Arabic script, and Pekan being a colloquial contraction of Peranakan.

== Chinese Peranakan ==
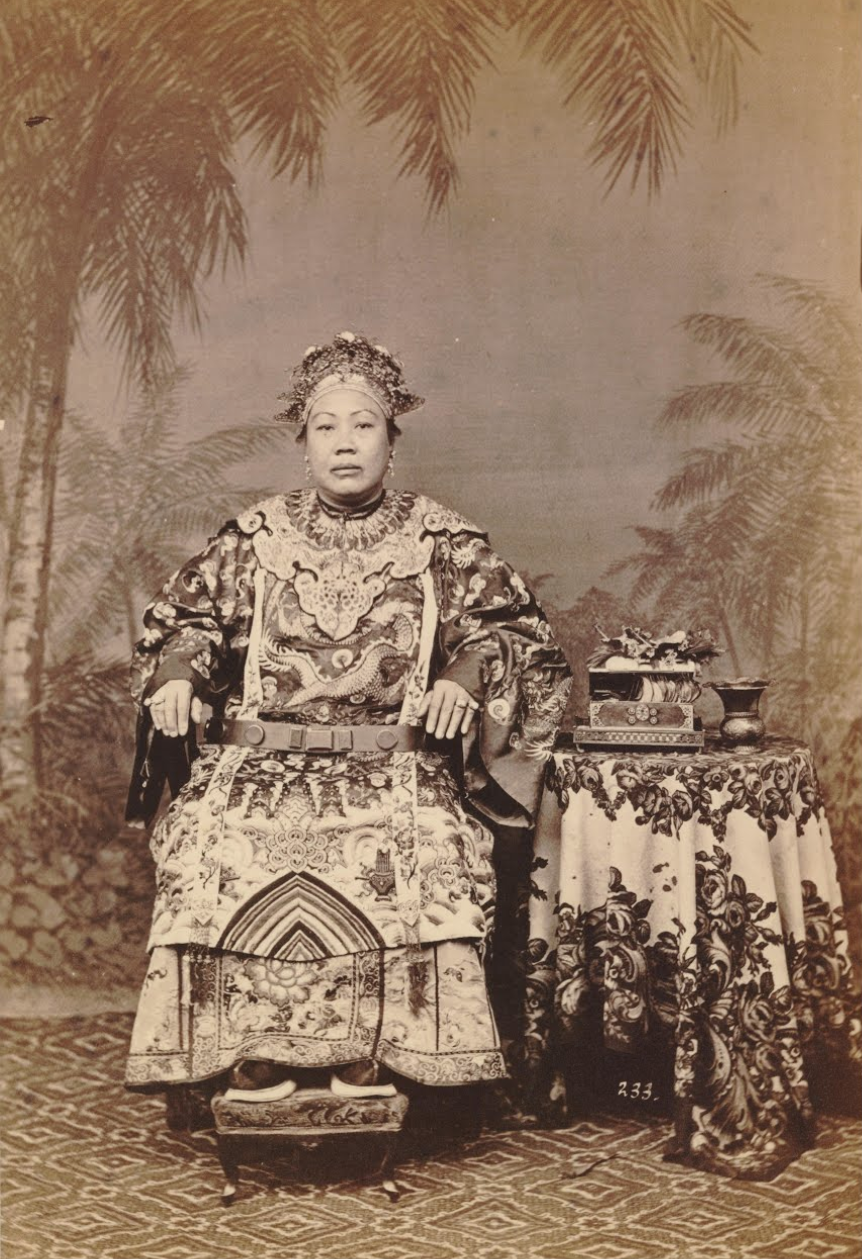
Njonja Majoor-titulair Be Biauw Tjoan (née Tan Ndjiang Nio), a prominent member of the Cabang Atas aristocracy

The prominence of Peranakan Chinese culture, has led to the common elision whereby 'Peranakan' may simply be taken to refer to the Peranakan Chinese, i.e. the culturally unique descendants of the earliest Chinese settlers in the Malay Archipelago, as opposed to the other smaller groups that also justifiably call themselves 'peranakan'. For some Peranakans of Chinese descent, calling oneself "Peranakan" without the qualifier "Chinese" can be a way of asserting an ethnic identity distinct from and independent of Chineseness (though such a use of "Peranakan" as a single-word ethnonym may clash with the desire of other groups of non-Chinese descent to equally call themselves "Peranakan").

Later waves of immigrants to South East Asia are generally referred to using larger umbrella terms such as Malaysian Chinese, Chinese Singaporean, Chinese Indonesian or Tionghoa, or Thai Chinese.

== Straits Chinese ==
The Straits Chinese or Straits-born Chinese are a sub-group of the Peranakan Chinese who were defined as those born or living in the Straits Settlements: a British colony consisting of Malacca, Penang, and Singapore which was established in 1826. Straits Chinese were not considered Baba Nyonya unless they displayed certain Sino-Malay syncretic attributes, in terms of attire worn, food, spoken language, choice of education, preferred career choices, choice of religion and loyalties.

However, given that 'Straits Chinese' is a geographical designator specific to the former British colonies in the region, whereas 'Peranakan Chinese' is a broader genealogical designator covering all parts of the Nusantara region where Chinese people settled (including areas colonised by the Dutch, who would not have used the word 'Straits'), the two terms cannot be said to fully overlap or be interchangeable. Someone who is said to be 'Straits Chinese' in British colonial documents might, for example, be non-Peranakan, i.e. a person who arrived in the Nusantara region during much later periods of Chinese migration.

Conversely, the other Dutch, Malay and Siamese-speaking Peranakan Chinese in Dutch East Indies, Siam and Malaya would be unlikely to refer to themselves using the English term 'Straits Chinese'.

== Baba-Nyonya ==
The Peranakan Chinese in Malaysia and Singapore commonly refer to themselves as Baba-Nyonya. The term Baba is an honorific for Straits Chinese men. It originated as a Hindi (originally Persian) loan-word borrowed by Malay speakers as a term of affection for one's grandparents, and became part of the common vernacular. In Penang Hokkien, it is pronounced bā-bā (in Pe̍h-ōe-jī), and sometimes written with the phonetic loan characters 峇峇. Female Straits-Chinese descendants were either called or styled themselves Nyonyas. Nyonya (also spelled nyonyah or nonya) is a Malay and Indonesian honorific used to refer to a foreign married lady. It is a loan word, borrowed from the old Portuguese word for lady donha (compare, for instance, Macanese creole nhonha spoken on Macau, which was a Portuguese colony for 464 years). Because Malays at that time had a tendency to address all foreign women (and perhaps those who appeared foreign) as nyonya, they used that term for Straits-Chinese women as well. It gradually became more exclusively associated with them. In Penang Hokkien, it is pronounced nō͘-niâ (in Pe̍h-ōe-jī), and sometimes written with the phonetic loan characters 娘惹.

== Ancestry ==
Peranakan Chinese people are of predominantly Chinese ancestry. However, unlike the non-Peranakan Chinese population in the Nusantara region, the majority of Peranakan Chinese have a significant amount of Malay or other bumiputera/pribumi ancestry, with much of it from their maternal lineage. According to a 2021 genetic study, the Peranakan Chinese population within Singapore has an average of 5–10% Malay ancestry.

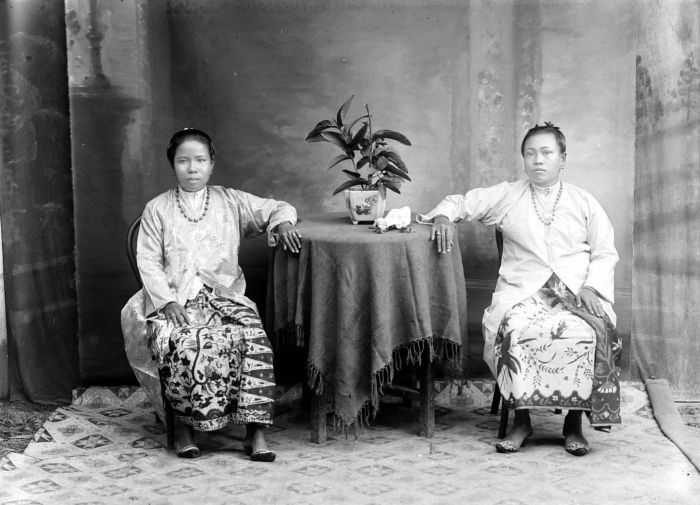
Two Peranakan women at a tin factory in Pulau Singkep, Riau Islands.

Many Peranakans identify as Holoh (Hokkien) despite being of numerous origins, such as the descendants of adopted local Malaysian aborigines. A sizeable number are of Teochew or Hakka descent, including a small minority of Cantonese.

Baba Nyonya are a subgroup within Chinese communities. Peranakan families occasionally arranged brides from China for their sons or arranged marriages for their daughters with newly arrived Chinese immigrants.

There are parallels between the Peranakan Chinese and the Cambodian Hokkien, who are descendants of Hoklo Chinese. Likewise the Pashu of Myanmar, a Burmese word for the Peranakan or Straits Chinese who have settled in Myanmar.

They maintained their culture partially despite their native language gradually disappearing a few generations after settlement.

Popular myths by the Malays of the Peranakan Chinese in Malacca, Singapore, and Penang sometimes state exclusive descent from the royal retinue of an allegedly princess named Hang Li Po—alleged by the Malay Annals as having made a marriage of alliance with the Sultan of Malacca in the fifteenth century however modern historians disproved the princess marriage as a false myth by the Malay Annals.

== Language ==
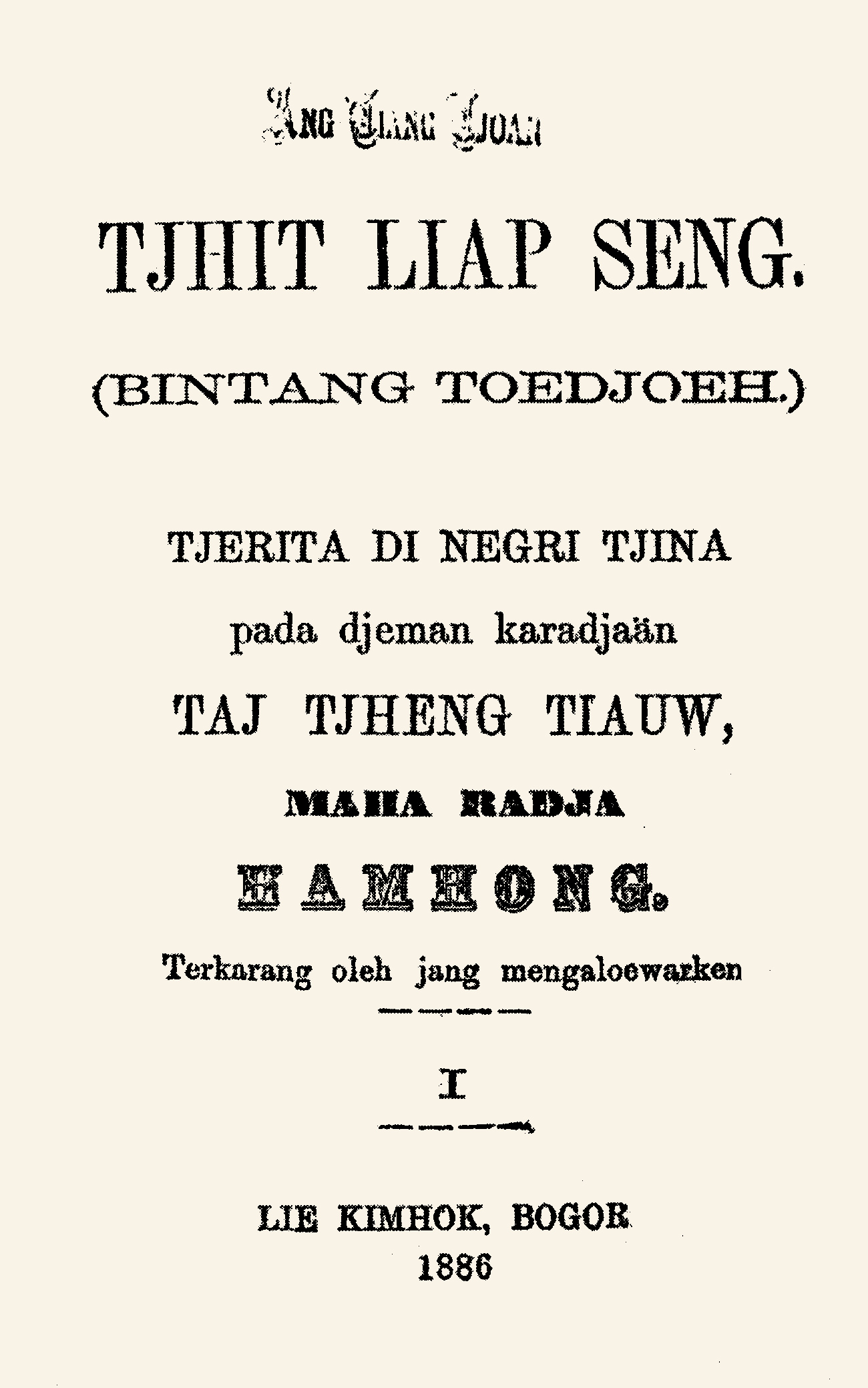
Tjhit Liap Seng (1886) by Lie Kim Hok was considered the first Chinese Malay novel.

The language of the Peranakans, Baba Malay (Bahasa Melayu Baba) or Peranakan Malay, is a creole language related to the Malay language (Bahasa Melayu), which contains many Hokkien words. It is a dying language, and its contemporary use is mainly limited to members of the older generation. It is common for the Peranakan of the older generation (particularly among women) to latah in Peranakan Malay when experiencing unanticipated shock.

The Peranakan Malay spoken by the Malaccan Peranakans community is strongly based on the Malay language as most of them can only speak little to none of the language of their Chinese forebears. Whereas in the east coast of Peninsula Malaysia, the Peranakans are known to not only speak a Hokkien version of their own but also Thai and Kelantanese Malay in Kelantan and Terengganu Malay in Terengganu. Unlike the rest of the Peranakans in Malaysia, Penang Peranakans are much heavily influenced by a dialect of Hokkien known locally as Penang Hokkien.

In Indonesia, the Peranakan language is mainly based on Indonesian and Javanese, which is mixed with elements of different Chinese varieties, mostly Hokkien. Speakers of the Peranakan language can be found scattered along the northern coastline area throughout West Java, Central Java and East Java, and also in Special Region of Yogyakarta, Indonesia. Young Peranakans can still speak this creole language, although its use is limited to informal occasions.

== History ==
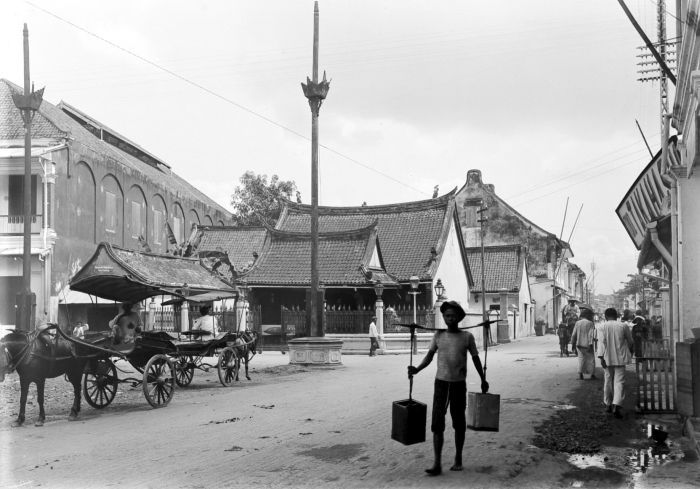
Hok An Kiong Chinese Temple, Jalan Coklat, Surabaya c. 1900 – 1920. Large Chinese communities were already present in Java when the Dutch arrived just before the 1600s. Many Chinese had native concubines until a large group of mestizos arose, who spoke Malay or Javanese.

The first Chinese immigrants to settle in the Malay Archipelago arrived from Guangdong and Fujian provinces in the 10th century AD. They were joined by much larger numbers of the Chinese in the 15th through 17th centuries, following on the heels of the Ming emperor's reopening of Chinese-Malay trade relations in the 15th century.

In the 15th century, some small city-states of the Malay Peninsula often paid tribute to various kingdoms such as those of China and Siam. Close relations with China were established in the early 15th century during the reign of Parameswara when Admiral Zheng He (Cheng Ho), a Muslim Chinese, visited Malacca and Java during his expedition (1405–1433). According to a legend in 1459, the Emperor of China sent a princess, Hang Li Po, to the Sultan of Malacca as a token of appreciation for his tribute. The nobles (500 sons of ministers) and servants who accompanied the princess initially settled in Bukit Cina and eventually grew into a class of Straits-born Chinese known as the Peranakans.

Chinese men in Melaka fathered children with Javanese, Batak and Balinese slave women. Their descendants moved to Penang and Singapore during the period of British rule. Chinese men in colonial southeast Asia also obtained slave wives from Nias. Chinese men in Singapore and Penang were supplied with slave wives of Bugis, Batak, and Balinese origin. The British colonial government tolerated the importation of slave wives since they improved the standard of living for the slaves and provided contentment to the male population. The usage of slave women or house maids as wives by the Chinese was widespread.

It cannot be denied, however, that the existence of slavery in this quarter, in former years, was of immense advantage in procuring a female population for Pinang. From Assaban alone, there used to be sometimes 300 slaves, principally females, exported to Malacca and Pinang in a year. The women get comfortably settled as the wives of opulent Chinese merchants, and live in the greatest comfort. Their families attach these men to the soil; and many never think of returning to their native country. The female population of Pinang is still far from being upon a par with the male; and the abolition therefore of slavery, has been a vast sacrifice to philanthropy and humanity. As the condition of the slaves who were brought to the British settlements, was materially improved, and as they contributed so much to the happiness of the male population, and the general prosperity of the settlement, I am disposed to think (although I detest the principles of slavery as much as any man), that the continuance of the system here could not, under the benevolent regulations which were in force to prevent abuse, have been productive of much evil. The sort of slavery indeed which existed in the British settlements in this quarter, had nothing but the name against it; for the condition of the slaves who were brought from the adjoining countries, was always ameliorated by the change; they were well fed and clothed; the women became wives of respectable Chinese; and the men who were in the least industrious, easily emancipated themselves, and many became wealthy. Severity by masters was punished; and, in short, I do not know any race of people who were, and had every reason to be, so happy and contented as the slaves formerly, and debtors as they are now called, who came from the east coast of Sumatra and other places. John Anderson – Agent to the Government of Prince of Wales Island

People of Chinese ancestry in Phuket, Thailand make up a significant population, many of whom having descended from tin miners who migrated to the island during the 19th century. The Peranakans there are known as "Phuket Babas" in the local tongue, constitute a fair share of members Chinese community, particularly among those who have family ties with the Peranakans of Penang and Malacca.

Many Peranakan Chinese in Java, Indonesia are descendants of non-Muslim Chinese men who married abangan Javanese Muslim women. Most of the Chinese men did not convert to Islam since their Javanese wives did not ask them to, but the minority of Chinese who married local Javanese women and converted to Islam created a distinct Chinese Muslim Peranakan community in Java. At the time, adoption of Islam was considered to be a strong indicator of Peranakan status. Over time, the Batavian Muslim population absorbed the Chinese Muslim community descended from converts. By the 19th century, due to restrictions enacted during Dutch colonization as well as to prevent absorption by the increasingly Arab-influenced Muslim population, the remaining non-Muslim Chinese Peranakans generally stopped marrying Javanese and would typically only marry fellow Peranakans or Chinese. The Chinese population in Java, including many Peranakan Chinese, contributed to popular uprisings against Dutch colonial rule, such as the 1912 riots in Surabaya and Batavia.

Peranakans were held in high regard by Malays. Some Malays in the past may have taken the word "Baba", referring to Chinese males, and put it into their name, when this used to be the case. This is not followed by the younger generation, and the current Chinese Malaysians do not have the same status or respect as Peranakans used to have.

In Penang, Thai women replaced Nias slave women and Batak slave women as wives of Chinese men after the 1830s when slavery was abolished.

DNA tests performed on Chinese Peranakan in Singapore showed that those Peranakan who are mixed with Malays are mostly of paternal Han Chinese descent and of maternal Malay descent. Peranakans in Malaysia and Singapore formed when non-Muslim Chinese men were able to marry Malay Muslim women a long time ago without converting to Islam. This is no longer the case, as anyone who marries Malay women is typically required to convert to Islam.

Peranakan, Straits Chinese, and Baba Nyonya are all names for the descendants of Han Chinese men and their Javanese, Sumatran and Malay wives. Han Chinese men did not allow their women to leave China, so they married local Muslim Javanese and other Southeast Asian women. Dayak women were married by Han Chinese men who settled in Borneo as noted in the 18th century.

In Borneo, the Chinese have long been traders and settlers on the coast and have often mixed with the natives. In addition to trading, the Chinese often worked as miners, agriculturists, and producers. The Philippines, Singapore, and Borneo receive, perhaps, a larger number of these immigrants than any other countries. In Borneo they are scattered over the whole seaboard, carrying on a good deal of the river trade, and supplanting in many ways the Malay. Within the island, the Peranakan Chinese are chiefly found in West Borneo, especially in the mining districts, as in Sambas and Montrado (Menteradu) in Dutch territory. Numbers are settled around Bau and Bidi, in Sarawak, and in the capital, Kuching. In North Borneo an irruption of some thousands occurred on the opening up of the country, and great numbers are employed on the tobacco plantations lately established. In Labuan, and in Pengaron in South Borneo, the coal mines were worked by Chinese, and they still act as sago-washers in the former island. Bound together by societies with stringent laws, their system of co-operation enables them to prosper where others would fail. In West Borneo they thus became so powerful as to defy the Dutch Government, who had great difficulty in subduing them.

Among the Straits Chinese (Peranakan) descendants in Sulu, the Philippines is Abdusakur Tan II, the governor. Many Straits Chinese (Peranakans) migrated from Singapore to Jolo, Sulu and Mindanao to live and trade among the Moro Muslims like the Tausug people and Maguindanaons and sell weapons, rifles, cannon and opium to them in exchange for gutta-percha. Tausug and Chinese married each other and Chinese also converted to Islam. Moros carried out suicide juramentado attacks against the Japanese. Moro juramentados used opium in their attacks against US soldiers. American military officers Charles Wilkes saw Sulu Moro Sultan Mohammed Damaliel Kisand (spelling error of Jamalul Kiram) and his sons smoke opium and he had bloodshot eyes because of it. Datu Uto received Spencer and Enfield rifles from Straits Chinese (Peranakan) merchants. Lantaka swivel bronze cannon were sold by Chinese to the Moros who were fighting the Americans. A novel was written about this.

Balinese women, Bugis women and other native women in Indonesia who married Han Chinese men were buried according to Chinese custom with Chinese characters on their gravestones instead of being cremated.

== Culture ==
=== Clothing ===
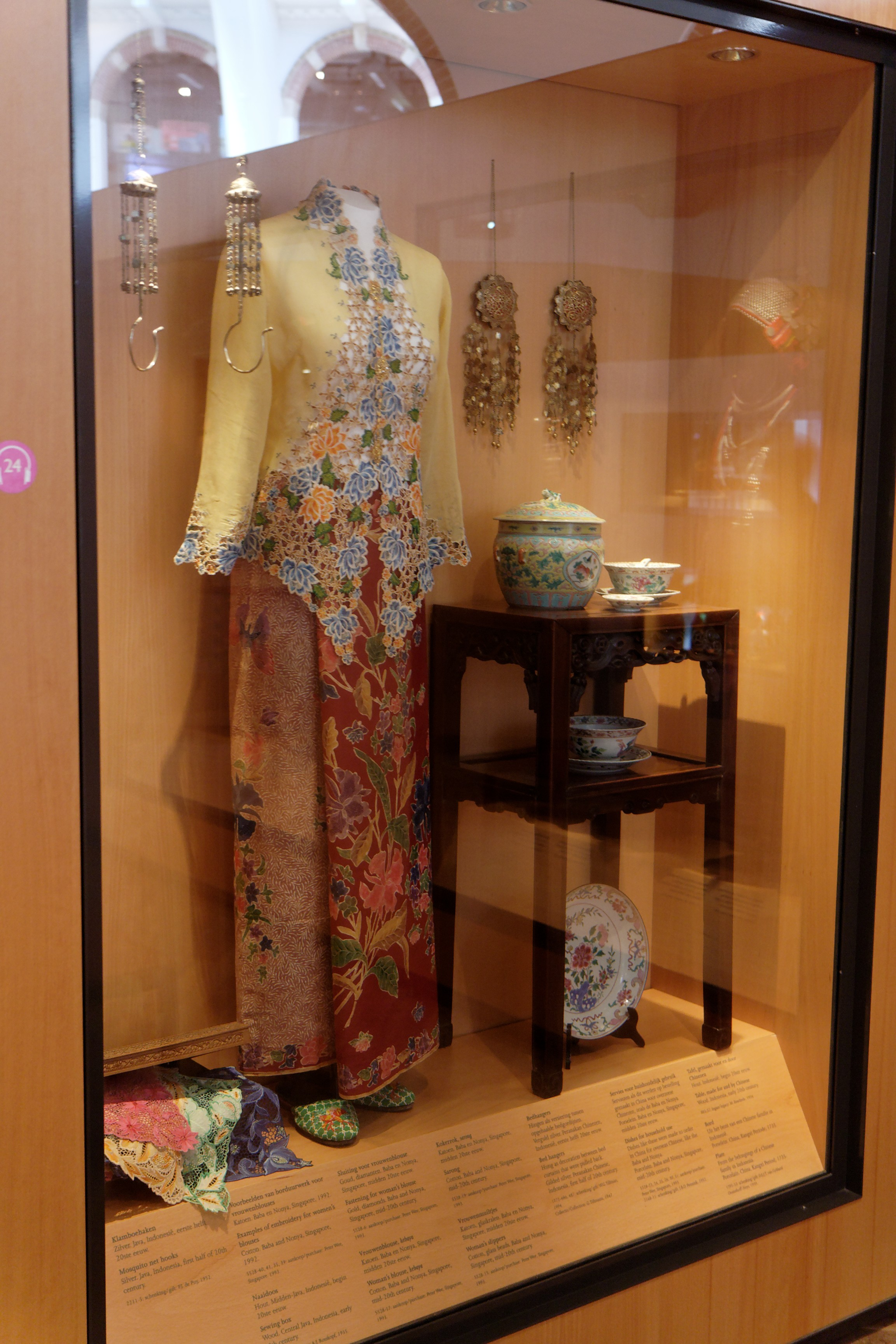
Kebaya Nyonya or Kebaya Encim, a traditional Peranakan attire.

The Peranakan retained most of their ethnic and religious origins (such as ancestor worship), but assimilated the language and culture of the Malays. The Nyonya's clothing, Baju Panjang (Long Dress) was adapted from the native Malay's Baju Kurung. It is worn with a batik sarong (batik wrap-around skirt) and three kerosang (brooches). Peranakan beaded slippers called Kasot Manek were hand-made with much skill and patience: strung, beaded and sewn onto canvas with tiny faceted glass cut beads (known as Manek Potong) similar to ones from Bohemia (present-day Czech Republic).

Traditional kasot manek design often have European floral subjects, with colours influenced by Peranakan porcelain and batik sarongs. They were made into flats or bedroom slippers. But from the 1930s, modern shapes became popular and heels were gradually added.

In Indonesia, the Peranakans develop their own kebaya, most notably kebaya encim, derived from the name encim or enci to refer to a married Chinese woman. Kebaya encim was commonly worn by Chinese ladies in Javan coastal cities with significant Chinese settlements, such as Semarang, Lasem, Tuban, Surabaya, Pekalongan and Cirebon. It marked differently from Javanese kebaya with its smaller and finer embroidery, lighter fabrics and more vibrant colours. They also developed their own batik patterns, which incorporate symbols from China. The kebaya encim fit well with vibrant-coloured kain batik pesisiran (Javan coastal batik), which incorporated symbols and motives from China; such as dragon, phoenix, peony and lotus. For the Baba they will wear baju lokchuan (which is the Chinese men's full costume) but the younger generation they will wear just the top of it which is the long-sleeved silk jacket with Chinese collar or the batik shirt.

=== Religion ===
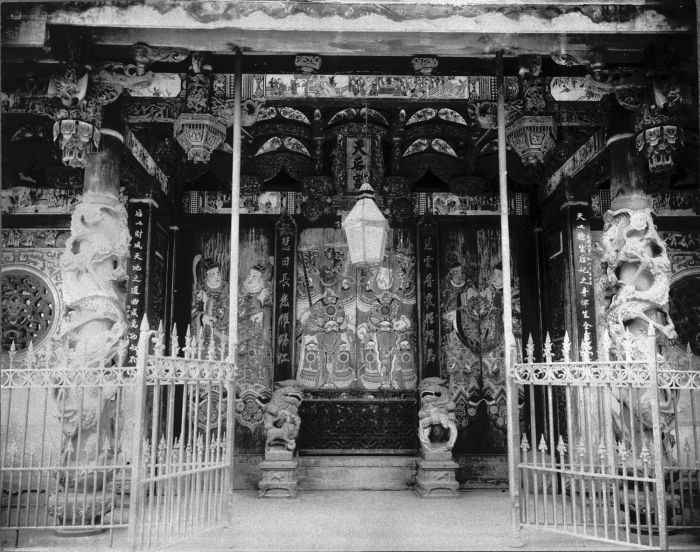
A Chinese temple in Makassar, Dutch East Indies (present-day Indonesia) c. 1900 – 1920.

Many Peranakans subscribe to Chinese belief systems such as Taoism, Confucianism and Han Buddhism, although a significant population adheres to other religions such as Christianity and Islam. The Peranakan Chinese also typically celebrate Chinese New Year, Lantern Festival and other Chinese festivals, while adopting the customs of the land they settled in, as well as those of their colonial rulers. There are traces of Portuguese, Dutch, British, Malay and Indonesian influences in Peranakan culture.

Older Peranakans often still believe in pantang larang (meaning taboos) especially among the older generations. In some cases, quite a number the Peranakan's pantang larang are deemed too strict and complex. Many younger Peranakans no longer practice complex pantang larang to keep up with the modern times.

==== Christianity ====
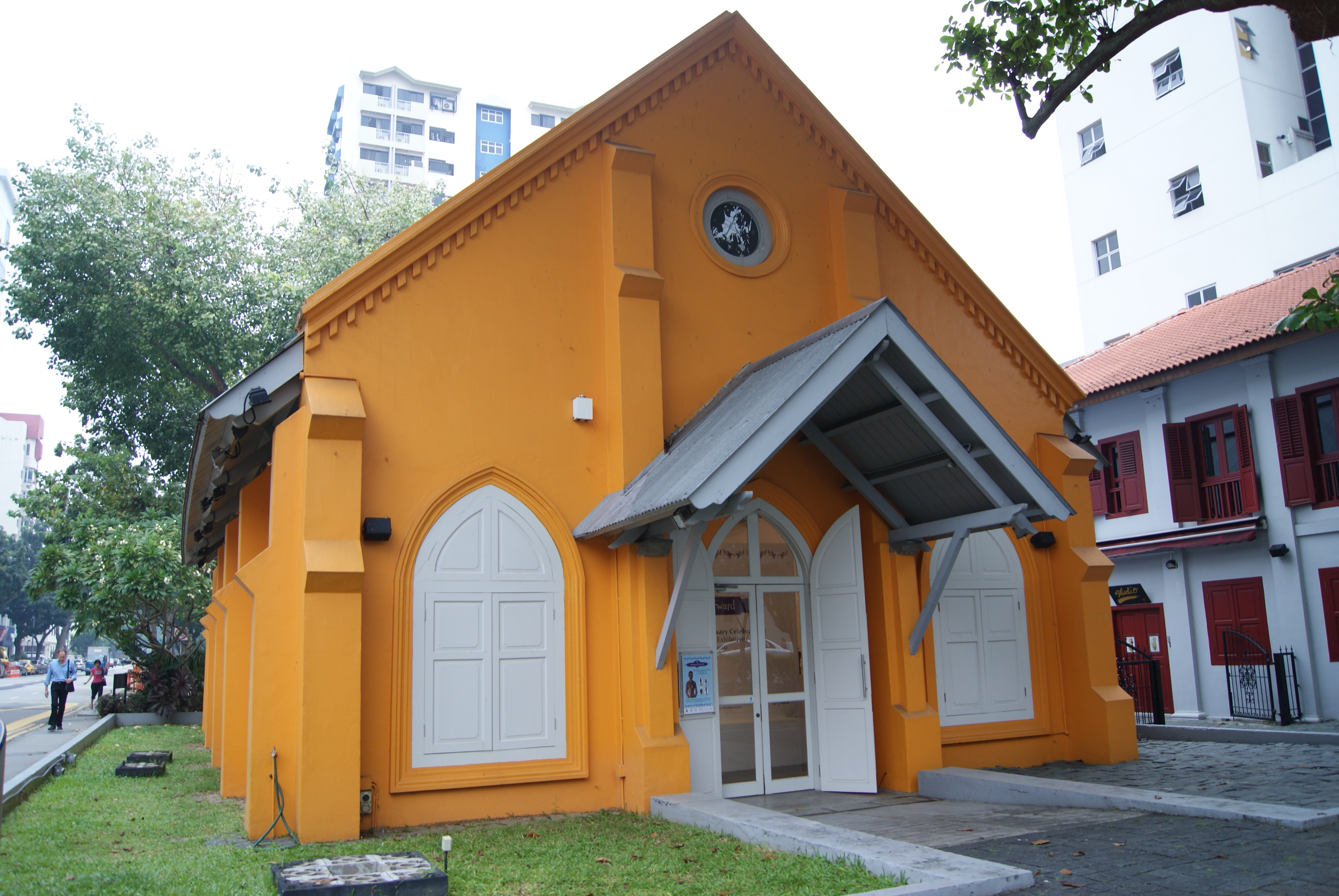
The Kampong Kapor Methodist Church, Singapore.

A significant number of the modern Peranakan community have embraced Christianity, most notably in Indonesia.

In 2019, a new branch of Singapore-specific Peranakan intermarriages were found to exist within the early Roman Catholic Church starting from 1834. This early church was set up by French missionaries (Mission Enstrangeres de Paris Order) in 1832 on Bras Basah Road, on the grounds of the present day Singapore Art Museum. Approximately 26 intermarriages between mainly China-born Teochew men and Melaka Serani, Malay, Peranakan Chinese and Indian women, took place under the auspices of this church, between 1834 and the early 1870s. Most, if not all descendants, identify as Teochew Peranakans today.

In Singapore, the Kampong Kapor Methodist Church, founded in 1894 by an Australian missionary, Sophia Blackmore, is considered one of the first Peranakan churches. During its establishment, Sunday service were conducted in Baba Malay language, and it is still one of the languages being used in their services.

Despite living in Muslim majority countries such as Indonesia and Malaysia, converting to Christianity allows Peranakans to continue eating pork, which is a major part of the Peranakan diet. Moreover, Peranakans were traditionally English educated at missionary schools, notably in Penang.

==== Islam ====
In Indonesia, up until the 19th century, the term "Peranakan" often referred to all Indonesian Chinese who had converted to Islam. This indicated the importance of Islamic identity as a "criterion of indigenization." Later, the term began being used to refer to all Indonesian Chinese born in the country, including those descended from mixed race unions. Large numbers of Peranakans, many from Fujian having prior experience with foreign Muslims who had a dominant position in that provinces most important seaport, adopted Islam in Java, strongly Muslim areas of Indonesia, and Malaysia. As in the case of the Peranakans in Cirebon, this conversion process occurred over several centuries and was even recorded before the Dutch seized Jakarta. Many of these Peranakans in Indonesia who converted to Islam would marry into aristocratic dynasties. One organisation of Indonesian Peranakan Muslims is the Persatuan Islam Tionghoa Indonesia (Association of Indonesian Chinese Muslims), which was formed in 1936 in Medan. Some prominent Peranakan Muslims include the Indonesians Junus Jahja, Abdul Karim Oei Tjeng Hien and Tjio Wie Tay and from Pattani, the Peranakan convert to Islam, Datu Seri Nara, who according to Wybrand of Warwijck was the most important commercial and military figure in Pattani in 1602.

=== Food ===
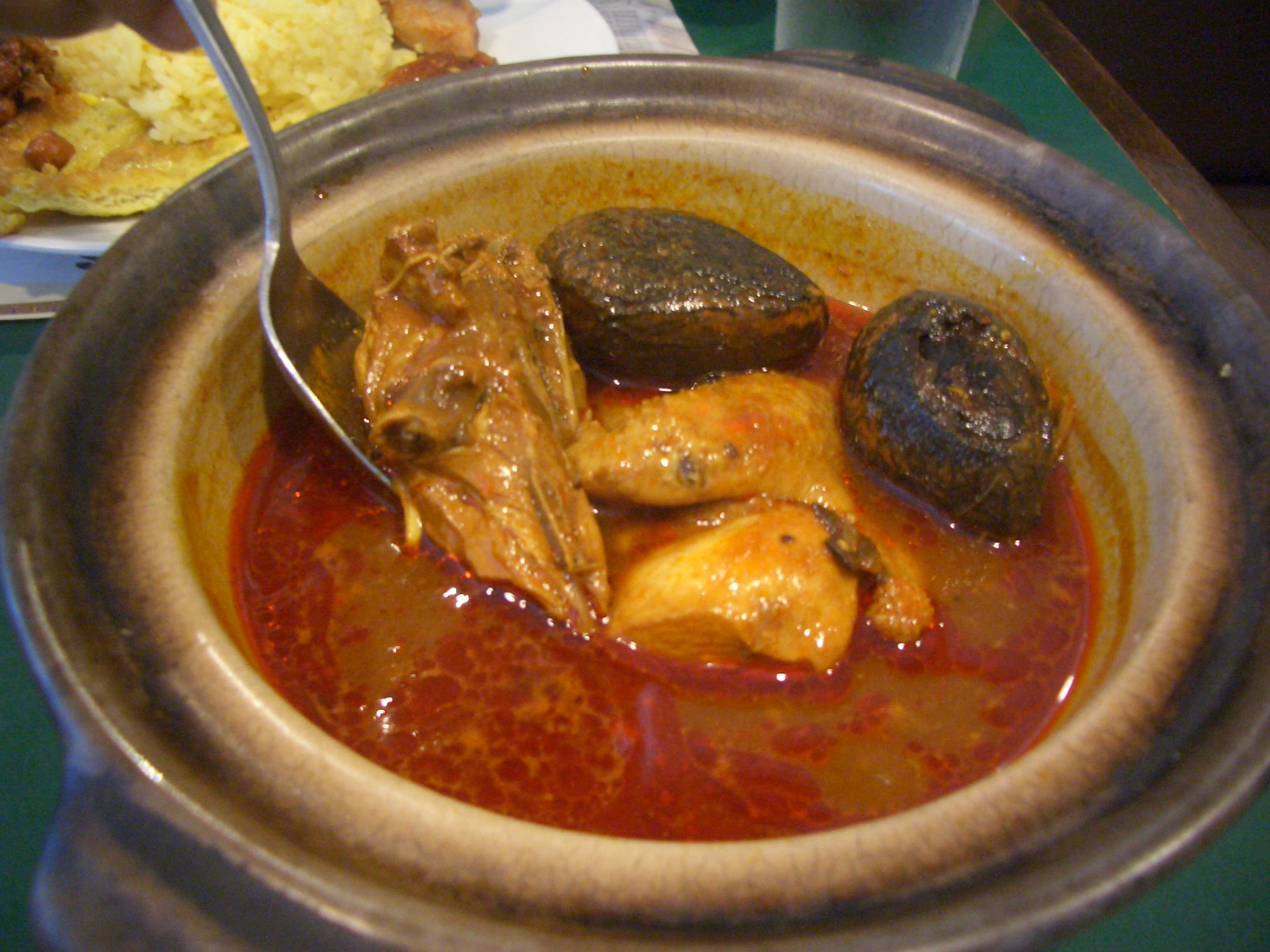
Ayam buah keluak, a traditional Peranakan dish.

Peranakan cuisine shows influences from Malay, Chinese, and Indonesian cultures. Malacca was once a major merchant gathering point, with the resulting trade influencing the development of Peranakan food.

A unique Peranakan or "Nyonya" cuisine has developed using typical Malay spices. Examples are chicken kapitan, a dry chicken curry and inchi kabin, a Nyonya version of fried chicken. Pindang bandeng is a common fish soup served in Indonesia during the Chinese New Year and so is a white round mooncake from Tangerang which is normally used during the Autumn Festival. Swikee purwodadi is a Peranakan dish from Purwodadi, a frog soup dish.

Nyonya laksa is a very popular dish in Malacca, Malaysia while another variant called asam laksa is famous in Penang, Malaysia. Pongteh is also another popular and savoury dish of the Malaccan Peranakan community. The main ingredient is onion, black mushroom (optional), chicken (at times pork is used instead of chicken, hence it's called babi pongteh) and fermented bean sauce. The Malaccan Nyonyas are well known for this dish.

Other dishes from the east coast of Peninsular Malaysia Peranakans in Kelantan include telur kesum, ayam kerabu and khau jam are influenced by Chinese, Malay and Thai cuisine. While in Terengganu, popular Peranakan foods are such as the local version of crab cake, ayam pachok which resembles satay with a stronger flavour, fish in spicy tamarind sauce and slow-cooked chicken with palm sugar.

Besides that, Peranakans of Malacca are also well known for a wide variety of traditional cakes (kueh or kue) such as lepak kacang, ang ku kue (a black variant is called kueh ku hitam), kueh tae or nastar, Nyonya bak chang, apom balik (Peranakan's version closely resembles Indonesian's serabi), kueh bakol, tapae, kueh kochi, kueh bongkong, rempah udang, pulot enti, kueh gulong (another variant is kueh kapit), kueh bolu, galeng galoh (also known as seri muka), kueh bangket and many more. Traditional kueh (or kue) are sometimes made in conjunction with festivals that the Peranakans celebrate. For example, kueh genggang (also commonly known as kueh lapis), is a type of multi layered cake, most often eaten during Chinese New Year to symbolise a ladder of continued prosperity.

A small number of restaurants serving Nyonya food can be found in Penang and Malacca in Malaysia; and Jakarta, Semarang and Surabaya in Indonesia.

=== Marriage ===
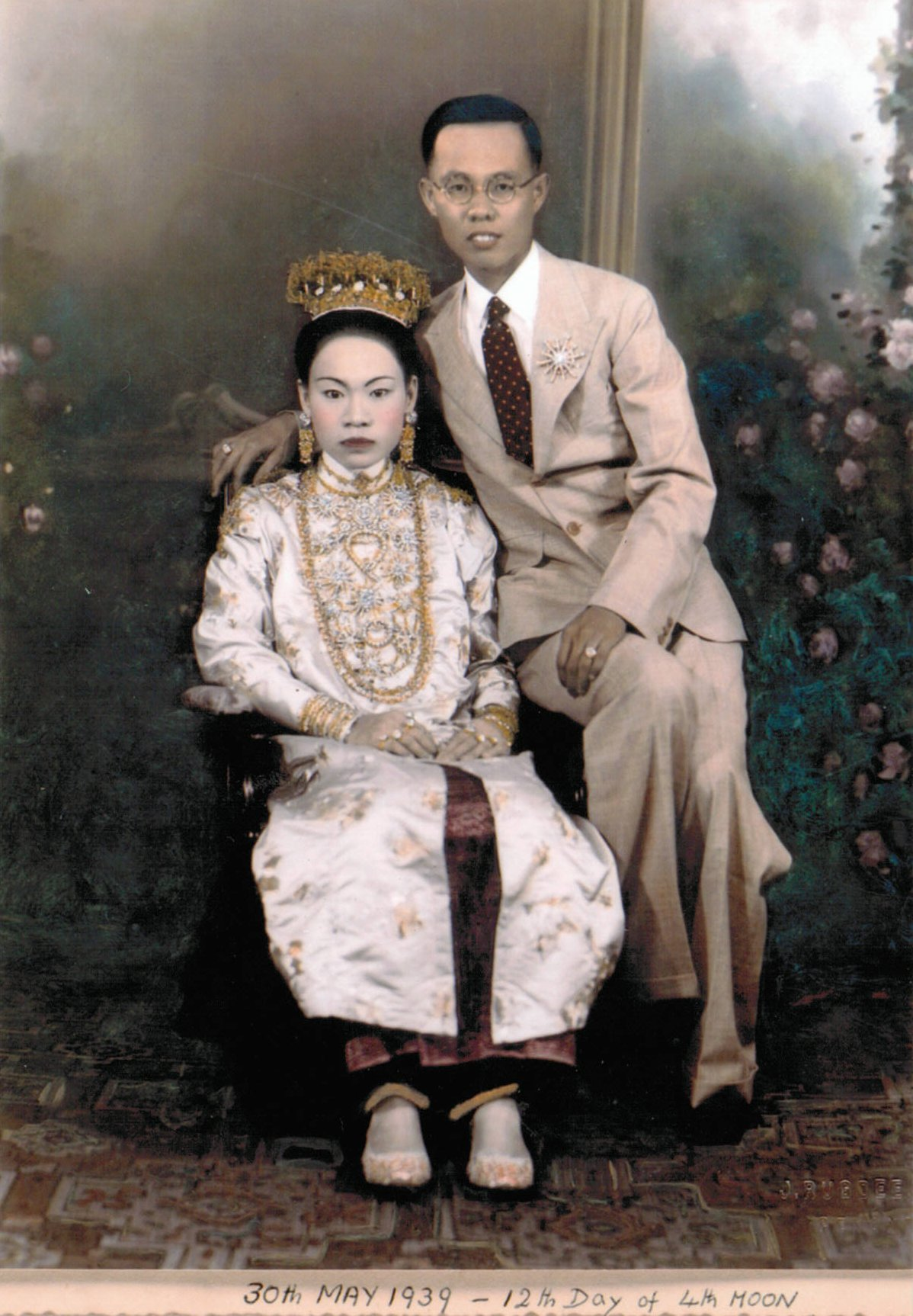
A Straits Peranakan bride and groom dated 30 May 1939.

It was not uncommon for early Chinese traders to take Malay women from Peninsular Malaya or Sumatra as wives or concubines. Consequently, the Baba Nyonya display a mix of Sino-Malay cultural traits.

Written records from the 19th and early 20th centuries show that Peranakan men usually took brides from within the local Peranakan community. Peranakan families occasionally imported brides from China and sent their daughters to China to find husbands.

Marriages within the community and of similar stature were the norm during that time. Wealthy men prefigured to marry a chin choay: or matrilocal marriage where husband moved in with the wife's family.

Proposals of marriage were made by a gift of a pinangan, in a 2-tiered lacquered basket known as Bakul Siah in Malaysia or Tenong Keranjang in Indonesia, to the intended bride's parents brought by a go-between who speaks on behalf of the suitor. There are rare cases where wealthy Peranakans in the past used highly decorative glided pagoda trays (Botekan Candi in Indonesian) instead of the Bakul Siah or Tenong Keranjang. Most Peranakans have retained the traditions of ancestor worship of the Chinese, though some have converted to Christianity and Islam.

The wedding ceremony of the Peranakan is largely based on Chinese tradition, and is one of the most colourful wedding ceremonies in Malaysia. At Malacca weddings, the Dondang Sayang, a form of extempore rhyming song in Malay sung and danced by guests at the wedding party, was a highlight. Someone would begin a romantic theme which was carried on by others, each taking the floor in turn, dancing in slow gyrations as they sang. It required quick wit and repartee and often gave rise to laughter and applause when a particularly clever phrase was sung. The melodic accents of the Baba-Nonya and their particular turns of phrase lead to the charm of this performance.

The important wedding rites had to be commenced on auspicious days at specific times, according to the pek ji, the eight Chinese characters annotating one's birth date and time. At these rites, pantangs (taboos) were carefully observed – the wedding rituals had to be legitimised and witnessed by elders, deities and ancestors. Marriages were typically match-made. Parents and elders made the final decision, but the potential bride and bridegroom were also consulted in the process. Wedding items commonly utilised the prosperous colours of red, pink, orange, yellow and gold and were embellished with special motifs to ensure a good marriage. Similar to the Chinese, Peranakans believed that good things always come in pairs, therefore many wedding items came in pairs.

=== Museums ===
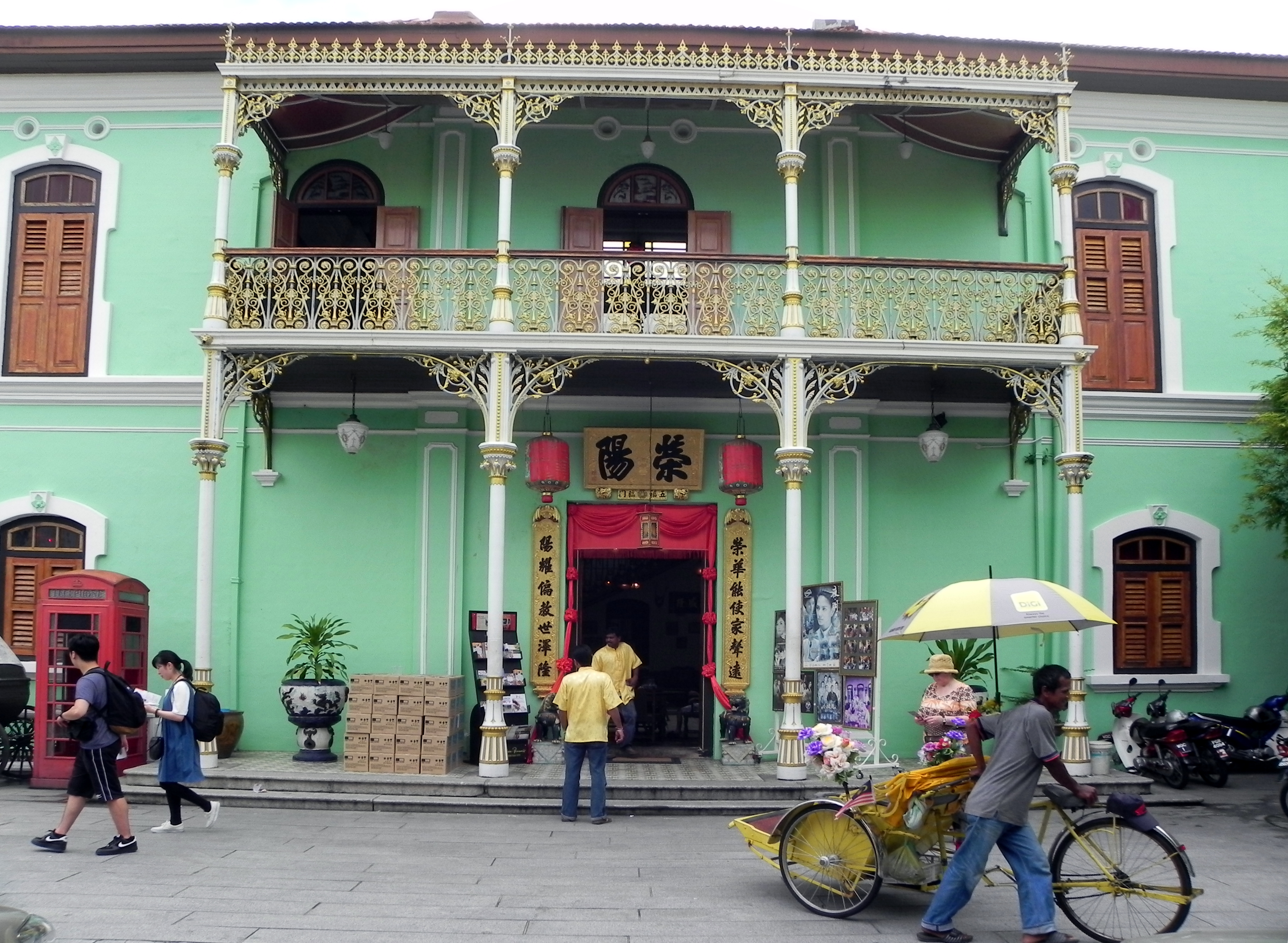
Pinang Peranakan Mansion, stately mansion built at the end of the 19th century, residence and office of Kapitan Cina Chung Keng Quee.

Historical and cultural items from the Peranakan culture are displayed in Baba Nyonya Heritage Museum, Straits Chinese Jewellery Museum and other cultural establishments on Heeren Street, Jonker Street and other streets in the same neighbourhood in Malacca; the Pinang Peranakan Mansion in Penang, Malaysia; and at the Peranakan Museum, Baba House and the Intan Museum in Singapore. Furniture, food, and even traditional clothes of the Baba and Nyonya are exhibited. Free weekly street shows featuring Baba performances, and traditional and pop Chinese cultural performances are found in Jonker Street in Malacca. The shows are part of the night market scene, and are usually crowded with shoppers, both local and foreign.

On 11 November 2011, Benteng Heritage Museum in Tangerang, near Jakarta is opened to display mainly about Benteng Chinese uses an old genuine traditional Chinese Peranakan house. And in August 2013, the Museum Peranakan Indonesia was officially opened by the Yayasan Budaya Tionghoa Indonesia. The museum is located at the Cheng Ho Museum, next to the Hakka Museum, at the pavilion of Taman Budaya Tionghoa Indonesia, Taman Mini Indonesia Indah in Jakarta.

Other Peranakan cultural collections such as batik and bead works can also be found in museums outside of South East Asia. Honolulu Museum of Art and Australian Museum are known to exhibit such collections.

Apart from that, exhibition of Peranakan Chitty history, antiques and culture can be seen at the Chitty Museum in Kampung Chitty, Malacca, Malaysia. In 2013, there were controversies of development at the expense of demolishing part of Kampung Chitty, a historical and cultural village. A proposal to construct a condominium, a hotel and a road cutting through the village are seen as a threat affecting the residents and a temple built in 1827.

In Kelantan, the Persatuan Peranakan Cina Kelantan or the Kelantan Chinese Peranakan Association (abbreviated as PPCK) have opened a gallery which provides visitors with various insights into the Kelantanese Chinese Peranakan culture.

=== Political affinity ===
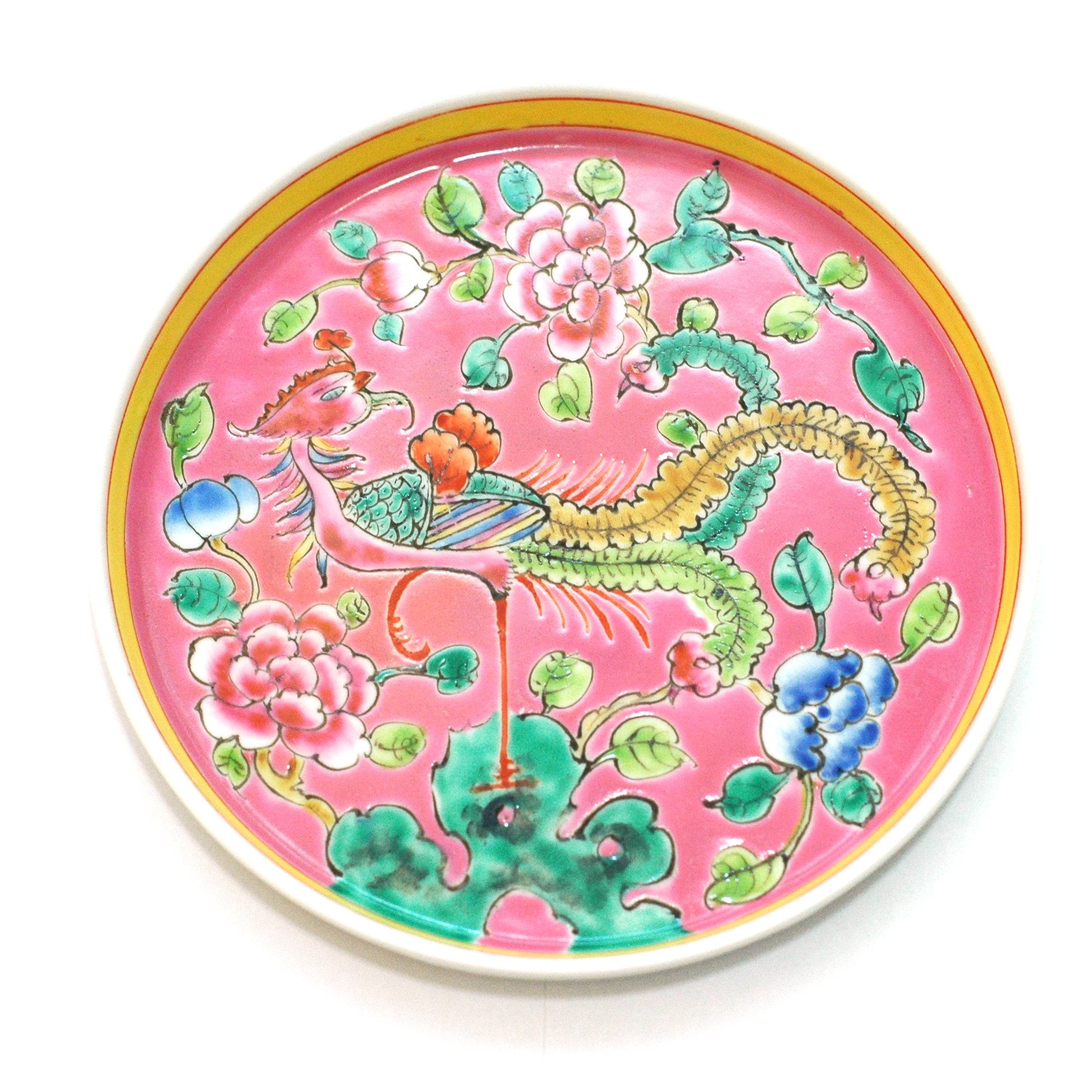
Multichrome Modern Chinese-made replica enamel porcelain tea tray with a traditional Peranakan fenghuang design

Many Peranakan were active in trade and considered supportive of continued European rule in Malaysia and Indonesia. Peranakans often played the role of middleman of the British and the Chinese, or the Chinese and Malays, because they were mostly English educated and spoke Malay more fluently than newer Chinese immigrants.

By the middle of the twentieth century, most Peranakan were English or Dutch-educated at Western-style institutions. Peranakans readily embraced Western culture and education as a means to advance economically thus administrative and civil service posts were often filled by prominent Straits Chinese. Many in the community chose to convert to Christianity due to its perceived prestige and proximity to the preferred company of British and Dutch officials.

The Peranakan community thereby became very influential in Malacca and Singapore and were known also as the King's Chinese due to their loyalty to the British Crown. Because of their interaction with different cultures and languages, most Peranakans were (and still are) trilingual, being able to converse in Chinese, Malay, and English. Common vocations were as merchants, traders, and general intermediaries between China, Malaya and the West; the latter were especially valued by the British and Dutch.

Things started to change in the first half of the 20th century, with some Peranakans starting to support Malaysian and Indonesian independence. In Indonesia three Chinese communities started to merge and become active in the political scene.

They were also among the pioneers of Indonesian newspapers. In their fledgling publishing companies, they published their own political ideas along with contributions from other Indonesian writers. In November 1928, the Chinese weekly Sin Po (Chinese: 新報; pinyin: xīn bào) was the first paper to openly publish the text of the national anthem Indonesia Raya. On occasion, those involved in such activities ran a concrete risk of imprisonment or even of their lives, as the Dutch colonial authorities banned nationalistic publications and activities.

Chinese were active in supporting the independence movement during the 1940s Japanese occupation, when the all but the so-called "Overseas Chinese Association", or residents of Chinese ancestry (Chinese: 華僑中會; pinyin: Huáqiáo Zhōnghuì) were banned by the Japanese military authorities. Some notable pro-independence activists were Siauw Giok Tjhan, Liem Koen Hian, and Yap Tjwan Bing, a member of Panitia Persiapan Kemerdekaan Indonesia, who in the 1960s became a citizen of the United States.

=== Chinese cultural Influence on Southeast Asian Muslims ===
Muslim Southeast Asians adopted Chinese symbols like the colour yellow for royals, including Malays, Javanese and Moros.

One Dutch mentioned "yellow Chinese belts which only the Javanese will buy."

Malays and Dayaks in Borneo did not use milk or dairy probably due to Chinese influence.

Malays adopted the Chinese zodiac. The Dragon (Loong) is normally equated with the nāga but it is sometimes called Big Snake (ular besar) while the Snake sign is called Second Snake (ular sani). This is also recorded in a 19th-century manuscript compiled by John Leyden.

== Current status ==
Peranakan culture has started to disappear in Malaysia and Singapore. Without support from the colonial government for their perceived ethnic independence, government policies in both countries following independence from colonial rule have resulted in the assimilation of Peranakans back into mainstream Chinese culture. Singapore classifies the Peranakans as ethnically Chinese, so they receive formal instruction in Mandarin Chinese as a second language (in accordance with the "Mother Tongue Policy") instead of Malay. In Malaysia, the standardisation of Malay as Bahasa Melayu—required for all ethnic groups—has led to a disappearance of the unique characteristics of Baba Malay.

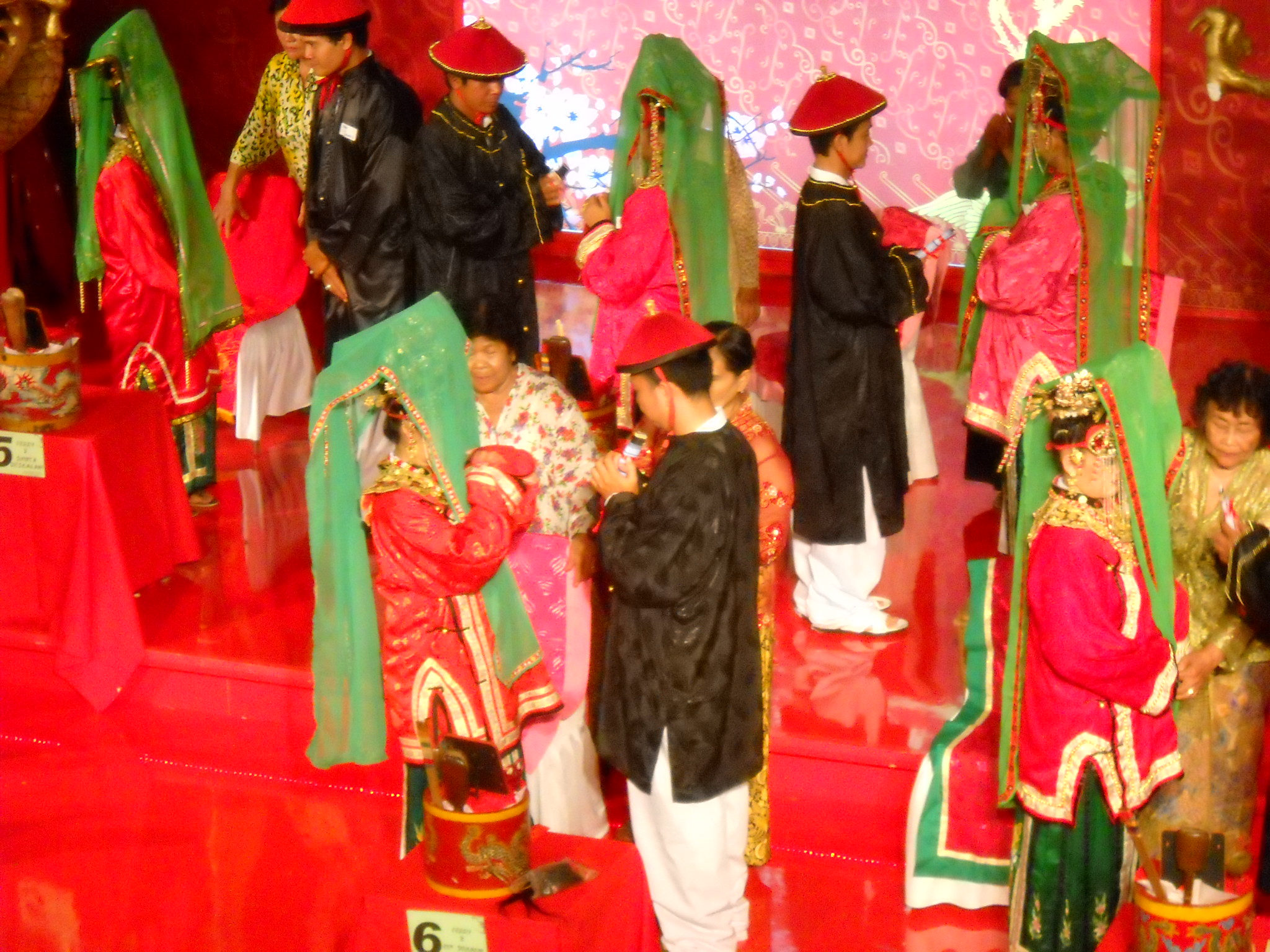
Mass wedding ceremony of Benteng Chinese, Jakarta 2012.

In Indonesia, the Peranakan culture appears to be losing popularity to modern Western culture, but to some degree the Peranakans are still trying to retain their language, cuisines and customs. Young Peranakans still speak their creole language, although many young women do not wear the kebaya. Marriages normally follow the western culture because the traditional Peranakan customs are losing popularity. Only three communities of Peranakan still uphold the traditional Peranakan wedding customs, Tangerang (by the Cina Benteng people), Makassar and Padang. Of the three communities the Cina Benteng people are the most adherent to the Peranakan culture, but their numbers are dwindling.

Cina Benteng people are normally poor people and many seek, or have sought, opportunities in other areas. Some organisations do try to ease their burden of living. As of May 2012, 108 Cina Benteng families are facing eviction from their traditional homes, the reason given by the Tangerang government being that the area they occupy is actually meant as a green space for the city. Most of these families are low income and have nowhere to move to, as the government is not providing enough money for them to relocate. Several traumatic eviction attempts at 2010 and 2011 ended in violence.

The migration of some Peranakan families, particularly the well-to-do, has led to a small Peranakan diaspora to neighbouring countries, mainly from Vietnam to Australia. The 1998 anti-Chinese riots in Indonesia during the fall of Suharto terrorised many Chinese Indonesians and Peranakans alike, causing Chinese Indonesian communities affected by the riots to leave the country. However, these communities are very small, and with the increasing use of the various languages in their respective countries, the use of Peranakan Malay or Baba Malay has been diluted, especially among the younger generation.

== Current associations ==
Associations of Chinese Peranakans include The Peranakan Association Singapore (TPAS), Aspertina (Asosiasi Peranakan Tionghoa Indonesia) and the Gunong Sayang Association (GSA), a performing arts group in Singapore. The Peranakan Association Singapore has over 2,000 members, and the Gunong Sayang Association has about 200 members. The Peranakan Association Singapore consists of a mix of young and old members, while the Gunung Sayang Association has primarily elderly or retired members. In Malacca, there is an Indian Peranakan Association known as the Chitty Melaka. This is a tightly knit community of Saivite Hindus. Chitty Peranakans display considerable similarity to Chinese Peranakans in terms of dressing, songs, folk dances and pantun.

In Malaysia, there are Peranakan associations in Malacca, Kuala Lumpur, Penang, Kelantan, and Terengganu. The Peranakan association that is based in Kelantan is named the Persatuan Peranakan Cina Kelantan (lit. the "Kelantan Chinese Peranakan Association", abbreviated as PPCK) while the one that is located in Terengganu is the Persatuan Peranakan Cina Terengganu (lit. the "Terengganu Chinese Peranakan Association").

The Thai Peranakans live largely in the southern region of Thailand, especially the coastal areas beside the Andaman Sea, including Krabi, Phang Nga, Phuket, Ranong, Satun, and Trang province and have an Association as well.

There are also Peranakan associations in Australia: Melbourne, Perth and New South Wales.

== Media ==
Cover art for a Hong Kong film, Nyonyah (1952) featuring a Kebaya Nyonya.

Interest in the Peranakan culture had begun as early as the 1950s with films from Hong Kong such as the Niangre / Nyonyah (Yue Feng, 1952), Fengyu Niuche Shui / Rainstorm in Chinatown (Yan Jun 1956), Niangre Yu Baba / Nonya And Baba (Yan Jun 1956), and Niangre Zhi Lian / Love With A Malaysian Girl (Lui Kei, 1969).

In Malaysia, a comedy drama series, Baba Nyonya was popular in the 1990s. The series is recognised by the Malaysian Book Of Records as the longest-running TV series in the country ever, lasting from the late 1980s until 2000, with 509 episodes in total.

Along the passing of the Reform Era in Indonesia and the removal of the ban on Chinese culture, in 1999, Indonesian writer Remy Sylado released a novel called Ca-Bau-Kan: Hanya Sebuah Dosa raised the Peranakan culture and history in Indonesia. The novel was adapted into a film called Ca-bau-kan by Nia Dinata in 2002. Riri Riza directed a biographical film on an Indonesian student activist named Soe Hok Gie (played by Nicholas Saputra), entitled Gie in 2005. The film is based on a diary Catatan Seorang Demonstran written by Soe Hok Gie, features a glimpse into the everyday life of an Indonesian Peranakan family in the 1960s. A novel that elevates the history and culture of the Benteng Chinese (Cina Benteng is another term in Indonesian referring to Peranakan) titled Bonsai: Hikayat Satu Keluarga Cina Benteng written by Pralampita Lembahmata and published by Gramedia in 2011.

In 2008, a Singaporean drama series The Little Nyonya was aired in Singapore. The storyline circles around the biographical flashback of an extended Peranakan Chinese family in Malacca, Malaysia, is set in the 1930s and spans to over 70 years and several generations of three families. It gained popularity in Singapore and later in Asia especially within South East Asia region. The filming of the drama took place in Malacca, Penang and Ipoh, Malaysia.

In Yasmin Ahmad films Sepet and Gubra has featured Peranakan character as the lead actor's mother played by Peranakan actress Tan Mei Ling. Lead actors from the 1990s Baba Nyonya series were also featured in Namewee's multi-language and multi-cultural film, Nasi Lemak 2.0 in 2011, showcasing Peranakan culture.

== Notable Peranakans ==
=== Indonesia ===
- Abdurrahman Wahid: The 4th President of Indonesia, and was the Chairman of Nadhlatul Ulama - the largest Muslim organisation in the world.
- Abimana Aryasatya: Actor
- Agnes Monica: Artist, singer
- Amir Syamsuddin: Minister of Justice and Human Rights (2011–2014)
- Arief Budiman: Also known as Soe Hok Djin, the older brother of Soe Hok Gie
- Arsjad Rasjid: Indonesian business executive
- Auwjong Peng koen: Indonesian journalist, founder of Kompas, a national newspaper
- Basuki Tjahaja Purnama: Politician
- Marcel Chandrawinata: Actor
- Chris John: Professional boxer
- Christian Hadinata: Badminton player
- Christian Sugiono: Actor
- Christianto Wibisono: Business analyst
- Chrisye: Singer
- Daniel Bambang Dwi Byantoro: Founder of the Indonesian Orthodox Church
- Didik Nini Thowok: Dancer
- Erick Thohir: Businessman and Minister of State Owned Enterprises
- Fifi Young: Actress
- Han Bwee Kong, Kapitein der Chinezen: magnate, government official and landlord in East Java
- Hok Hoei Kan: colonial politician, landlord, patrician and a member of the Han family of Lasem
- Ian Antono: Lead guitarist of God Bless
- Kartini Muljadi: businesswoman and owner of Tempo Scan Pacific
- Kho Sin-Kie: Professional tennis player
- Khouw Kim An, 5th Majoor der Chinezen of Batavia: bureaucrat, last Chinese head of colonial Jakarta, member of the Khouw family of Tamboen
- O. G. Khouw: philanthropist, landlord and member of the Khouw family of Tamboen
- Khouw Tian Sek, Luitenant-titulair der Chinezen: landlord, magnate and patriarch of the Khouw family of Tamboen
- Kwee Tek Hoay: Journalist, novelist
- Kwik Kian Gie: Economist, Coordinating Minister of Economics and Finance (1999–2000), and National Development Planning Minister (2001–2004) of Indonesia
- Lie Kim Hok: Teacher, writer and a social worker of the Dutch East Indies
- Liem Swie King: National shuttler
- Loa Sek Hie: colonial politician, community leader, landlord and founder of Pao An Tui
- Margaretha Tjoa Liang Tjoe: Novelist
- Mari Pangestu: Economist, Trade Minister (2004–2011), and Tourism and Creative Economy Minister (2011) of Indonesia
- Mario Teguh: Motivational speaker
- Mira Widjaja (Wong): Author, daughter of Othniel
- Oei Tiong Ham, Majoor-titulair der Chinezen: Businessman and founder of the largest conglomerate in the Dutch East Indies, Oei Tiong Ham Concern
- Oey Tamba Sia: playboy, tycoon's heir and criminal
- Phoa Keng Hek: Social worker and entrepreneur
- Phoa Liong Gie: colonial politician, jurist and newspaper owner, great-nephew of Phoa Keng Hek
- Rudy Hartono: National shuttler
- Soe Hok Gie: Student activist
- Kyai Ronggo Ngabehi Soero Pernollo: Chinese-Javanese nobleman, bureaucrat and police chief
- Susi Susanti: National shuttler
- Tan Joe Hok: National shuttler
- Tan Liok Tiauw: Colonial landlord, plantation owner, industrialist
- Tio Ie Soei: Writer and journalist of the Dutch East Indies
- Titi DJ: Artist, singer
- Thung Sin Nio (1902–1996): physician, politician, suffragist

=== Malaysia ===
- Andre Goh: Singer
- Azizan Baba: Former professional footballer
- Chan Kim Boon: Writer, poet, novelist and translator
- Chong Hon Nyan: Former cabinet minister
- Chua Boon Huat: Former hockey player
- Chuah Guat Eng: Novelist
- Chung Thye Phin: Last Kapitan China of the state of Perak and British Malaya
- Damian Yeo Shen Li: Politician and lawyer
- Desmond Ho: Landscape designer
- Emily Lim: Actress, model, host and nutritionist
- Gan Eng Seng: Malaccan born businessman and philanthropist in Singapore and Malaya
- Janet Khoo: Actress
- Johnny Lim: Retired lieutenant-general
- Joyce Chu: Singer and actress
- Kenny Chan: Actor and chef
- Khoo Kay Kim: Historian
- Kimberly Chuah: Actress, host and model
- Lina Tan: Film and television producer
- Mavin Khoo: Dancer, son of Khoo Kay Kim
- Nathaniel Tan: Politician and writer
- Ong Kim Swee: Football manager and former professional footballer
- Robert Choe: Former professional footballer
- Sharon Wee: Former professional squash player
- Sylvia Lee Goh: Painter
- Tan Chay Yan: Rubber plantation merchant and philanthropist, grandson of Tan Tock Seng
- Tan Cheng Lock: Founder and first President of Malaysian Chinese Association (MCA)
- Tan Siew Sin: Third President of Malaysian Chinese Association (MCA) and first Finance Minister of Malaysia (1959–1974), son of Tan Cheng Lock
- Tan Tock Seng: Malaccan born merchant and philanthropist in Singapore
- Tan Twan Eng: Penang-born novelist known for being the first Malaysian recipient of the Man Asian Literary Prize.
- Teo Kok Seong: Academician

=== Singapore ===
- Alvin Tan: Founder and Artistic Director of The Necessary Stage
- Chee Soon Juan: Secretary-General of the Singapore Democratic Party
- Chua Jim Neo: Chef and cookbook writer
- David Lim Kim San: Head of Music Department in the Ministry of Education (1969)
- Desmond Lee: Cabinet Minister and Chairman of the People's Action Party
- Dick Lee: Celebrity pop singer, composer and playwright
- Gan Eng Seng: Malaccan born businessman and philanthropist in Straits Settlement of Singapore and Malaya
- Goh Keng Swee: Deputy Prime Minister of Singapore
- Ivan Heng: Actor
- Lee Hsien Loong: Third Prime Minister of Singapore
- Lee Kuan Yew: First Prime Minister of modern Singapore
- Lim Boon Keng: Penang born physician and social activist in Singapore
- Lim Kim San: Former Cabinet Minister
- Lim Nee Soon: Merchant and entrepreneur of the Straits Settlement of Singapore
- Pierre Png: Mediacorp artiste
- Piya Tan: Buddhist writer and teacher
- Seow Poh Leng: Banker, philanthropist and a committee member of the Straits Settlement (Settlement of Singapore)
- Song Hoot Kiam: Teacher, cashier and a community leader
- Sir Song Ong Siang: Lawyer and active citizen of the Straits Settlement of Singapore, son of Song Hoot Kiam
- Tan Chin Tuan: Chairman of OCBC
- Tan Kim Ching: Politician and businessman, the eldest son of Tan Tock Seng, major donor of Tan Si Chong Su
- Tan Kim Seng: Malaccan born philanthropist and merchant
- Tan Tock Seng: Malaccan born merchant and philanthropist of the Straits Settlement of Singapore, leader of Hokkien clan and major donor of Thian Hock Keng
- Toh Chin Chye: Deputy Prime Minister of Singapore
- Tony Tan: Seventh President of Singapore
- Violet Oon: Chef, restaurateur, and food writer specialising in Peranakan cuisine
- Walter Woon: Lawyer, academic, diplomat, politician and 7th Attorney-General of Singapore
- Wee Kim Wee: Fourth President of Singapore

=== Thailand ===
- Khanaporn Janjirdsak: Chef of Thai Peranakan cuisine in Trang
- Phraya Ratsadanupradit Mahitsaraphakdi: Provincial administrator
- Tan Jin Nguan: Businessman and tin-mining entrepreneur

== See also ==
- Cabang Atas
- Minh Hương
- Overseas Chinese
- Sangley
