= Desmond Ho =

Malaysian landscape designer and horticulture specialist

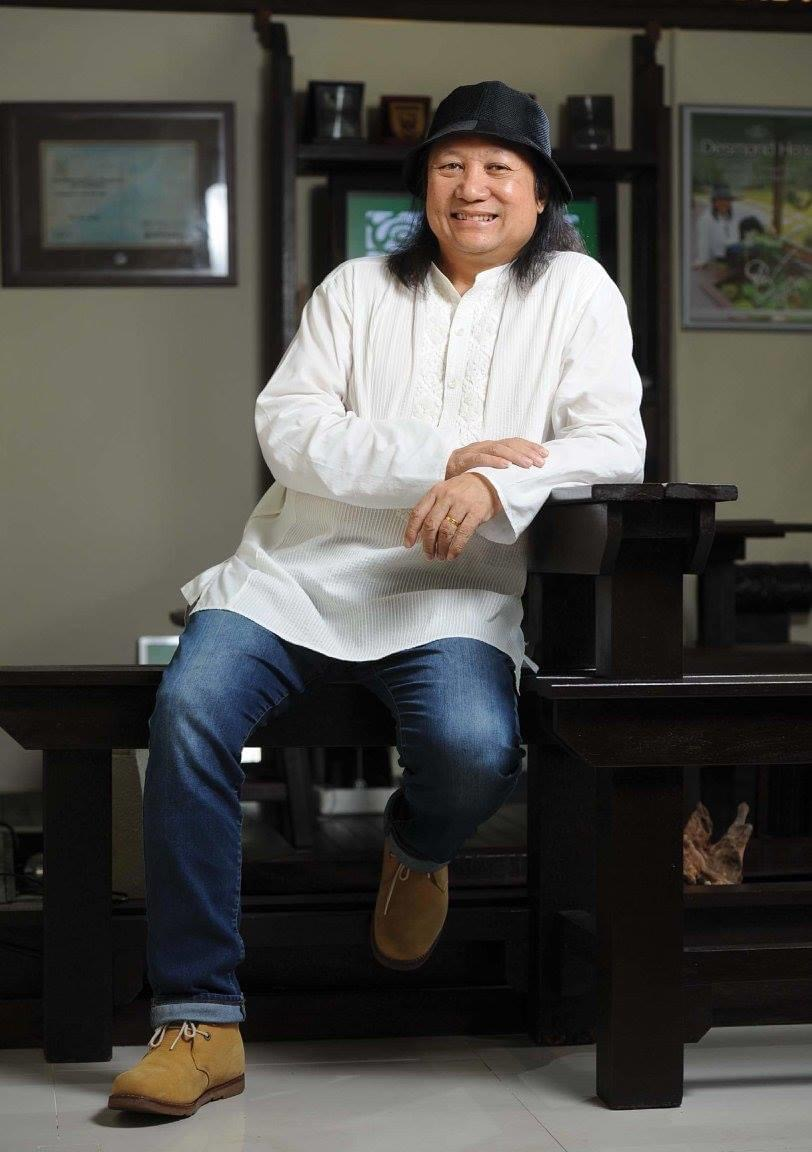
- Ho in 2016
- Born: 29 December 1961 (age 64); Malacca, Malaysia
- Occupations: Landscape designer Horticulture specialist Author
- Years active: 1991–present

Desmond Ho (born 29 December 1961) is a landscape designer and horticulture specialist based in Malaysia. He is responsible for initiating the Malaysian theme garden. It is called Neo Nusantara and reflects Malaysia's cultural heritage. His Malaysian garden concept has been recognized in Japan, Ireland, Switzerland, and New Zealand. He shared his knowledge and experiences through public press by becoming the columnist for New Straits Times, The Star, and Berita Harian, appearing in local shows such as Casa Impian and wrote a guidebook titled Desmond Ho's Guide to Beautiful Home Gardens published by MPH Group.

== Early life ==
Desmond Ho was born into a Peranakan family in Malacca, Malaysia on 29 December 1961. He then worked in advertising, sales and printing jobs before starting exploring terrariums for sales.

== Career ==
He started off by designing and building terrariums, then starting a garden centre called Terra Garden. Back in 1998, Terra Garden began by selling Potted Plants before he created the Malaysian garden concept that is based primarily on Malaysia's culture and craft as its distinct feature.

It added a new element to Malaysian identity through public landscaping as it reflects the history, art, and traditions of all cultures belonging in Malaysian society. His own house was built to be a modern-day village house that uses mostly ancient Malaya heritage with modern practicality.

All of its natural elements have cultural meaning. The patio has a Minangkabau outline with the tier decking which portray a traditional Malay verandah(pangkin); traditional Malaysian water pot called a tempayan; lighting inspired by the shape of banana flower (jantung pisang); and ceramic water feature of dayang bunting. Its lattice mimic the pattern of kain pelikat and batik patterned screens. It is a design concept in Malaysia that engages with the five senses approach, sight, sound, smell, touch, and taste in the designs.

== List of awards ==
- Good Design Award, Japan Industrial Design Promotion Council, Japan, 2003
- Garden Heaven Award (Bronze), Garden Heaven Show, Ireland, UK, 2006
- Award of Excellence, Waikato Home and Garden Show, Hamilton, New Zealand
- Gold medal at Shrewsbury Flower Show, Birmingham, 2008
