= Peranakan cut beads =

Glass beads used in Peranakan slipper-making

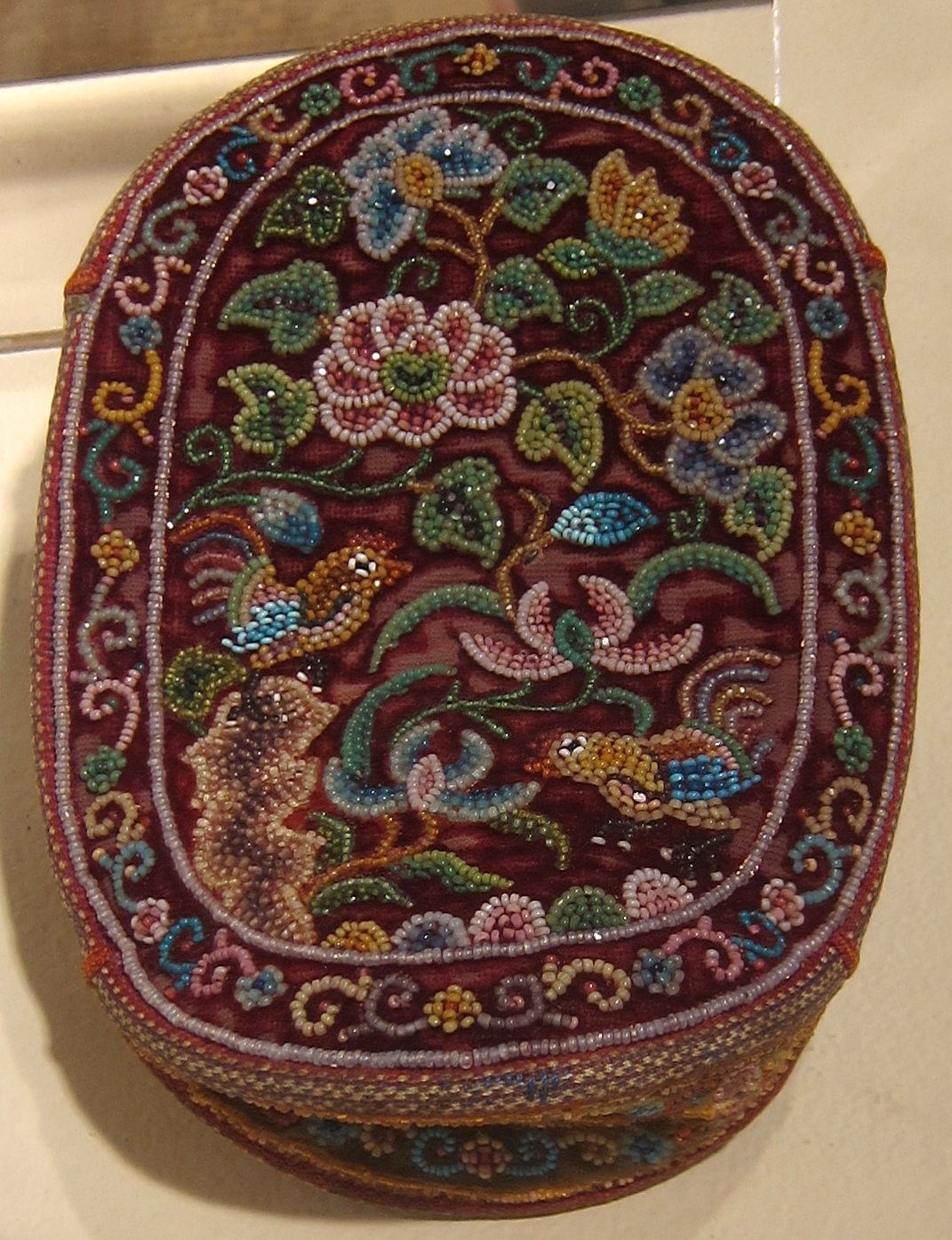
A late 19th century Peranakan woman's ceremonial purse (tas manik) with velvet weave and glass cut beads

Peranakan cut beads (Peranakan: Manek potong) are faceted glass beads used by the Peranakan women to make Peranakan beaded slippers (kasot manek) and other Peranakan artifacts like wedding veils, handbags, belts, tapestries and pouches.

The beads used in the past were very tiny multi-faceted glass seed beads from Europe. For the beaded slippers, both smooth and faceted beads were used to form the pattern.

Nowadays, the bead size commonly in use for Peranakan beadwork are sizes 15 to 18 (the larger the size number, the smaller the bead).

Modern day faceted beads are single-faceted seed beads, usually referred to as charlotte beads or 'charlottes'. These beads are usually from the Czech Republic.
