= Khoo Kay Kim =

Malaysian historian and academic (1937–2019)

Yang Berbahagia Emeritus Professor Tan Sri Dr. Khoo Kay Kim PSM DPMP DPMS JSM
- 邱继金
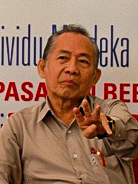
- Khoo speaking in a public forum, February 2009.
- Born: 28 March 1937; Kampar, Perak, Federated Malay States, British Malaya (now Malaysia)
- Died: 28 May 2019 (aged 82); University Malaya Medical Centre, Kuala Lumpur, Malaysia
- Education: University of Malaya
- Occupations: Historian, academic
- Spouse: Puan Sri N. Rathimalar @ Rathi Khoo (1966–2019)
- Children: Eddin Khoo, Rubin Khoo & Mavin Khoo
- Parent(s): Khoo Soo Jin (Father); Chuah Gaik See (Mother)

Khoo Kay Kim (simplified Chinese: 邱继金; traditional Chinese: 邱繼金; Pe̍h-ōe-jī: Khu Kè-kim; pinyin: Qiū Jìjīn; 28 March 1937 – 28 May 2019) was a Malaysian historian and academic of Peranakan Chinese descent.

He was honoured with Emeritus Professor title by the University of Malaya in 2001. In January 2011, Khoo was appointed Chancellor of KDU University College. Prime Minister Mahathir Mohamad described Khoo’s passing as a truly great loss to the country.

== Biography ==
Khoo Kay Kim was born to Peranakan Chinese parents in Kampar, Perak, Malaysia on 28 March 1937. During his early education, he would attend the English school in the morning before the Chinese school later in the afternoon. He received a BA, MA, and a PhD in 1959, 1967, and 1974 respectively from the University of Malaya. His doctoral thesis was entitled The Beginnings of Political Extremism in Malaya 1915-1935 (1974), where he was supervised by Kennedy G. Tregonning, the Raffles Professor of History at the University of Malaya. Khoo was one of the co-authors of the Rukun Negara . He was a highly regarded national academic for his views on local sports and socio-political issues.

== Personal life ==
He married Sri Rathi. The couple has three sons; traditional arts and culture advocate Eddin Khoo, Rubin Khoo and dancer Mavin Khoo.

== Death ==
Khoo died of lung failure on 28 May 2019, Tuesday morning at the University Malaya Medical Centre (UMMC), Petaling Jaya, Selangor at the age of 82.

== Honours ==
=== Honours of Malaysia ===
- Malaysia
  - Companion of the Order of Loyalty to the Crown of Malaysia (JSM) – (1983)
  - Commander of the Order of Loyalty to the Crown of Malaysia (PSM) – Tan Sri (2008)
- Perak
  - Knight Commander of the Order of the Perak State Crown (DPMP) – Dato' (1987)
- Selangor
  - Knight Commander of the Order of the Crown of Selangor (DPMS) – Dato' (2009)

=== Awards and accolades ===
- Malaysia
  - The 10th "Tokoh Akademik Negara" of the National Academic Awards or Anugerah Akademik Negara (AAN) (2017)
  - Merdeka Award for Outstanding Scholastic Achievement (2018)

=== Places named after him ===
In July 2019, the Selangor state government with the consent of the Sultan of Selangor, Sultan Sharafuddin Idris Shah decreed to rename Jalan Semangat in Petaling Jaya as Jalan Prof. Khoo Kay Kim in honouring the Khoo's contributions during his life.

== Selected bibliography ==
- The Western Malay States 1850-1873: The Effects of Commercial Development on Malay Politics (1972) ISBN 0196382521
- Taiping: Ibukota Perak (1981)
- Teluk Anson (Teluk Intan) 100 Tahun (1982)
- Malay Society: Transformation & Democratization: A Stimulating and Discerning Study on the Evolution of Malay Society Through the Passage of Time (1991) ISBN 9679783863
- His Majesty Sultan Azlan Shah (1991) ISBN 9679783731
- Sabah history and society (1981)
- 30 years of nationhood: a historical perspective (1987)
- Kuala Lumpur: The formative years (1996)
- Taiping: The Vibrant Years (2003) ISBN 9832759013
- 100 Years the University of Malaya (2005) ISBN 9831003268, 9831003233
- I, KKK: The Autobiography of a Historian (2017) ISBN 9789671493007
- Darurat 1948-1960 (editor)
- Photojournalism and the Imaging of Modern Malaysia 1957-2007 (contributor)
- Glimpses of the Past (contributor)
