= Mavin Khoo =

Malaysian dancer

- Born: Mavin Khoo Bu-Aun; 30 April 1976 (age 50); Kuala Lumpur, Malaysia
- Education: Middlesex University
- Occupation: Bharatanatyam dancer
- Parent(s): Khoo Kay Kim (Father); N. Rathimalar (Mother)
- Website: Official website

Mavin Khoo (Mavin Khoo Bu-Aun) is a Malaysian dancer of the Indian classical dance form, Bharatanatyam.

== Early life and education ==
Born on 30 April 1976 born in Kuala Lumpur, Malaysia, a youngest son to Tan Sri and Puan Sri Khoo Kay Kim. His father Tan Sri Khoo Kay Kim is a national leading historian. Mavin began his training in Bharata Natyam under Vatsala Sivadas and Vasuki Sivanesan at the Temple of Fine Arts, Kuala Lumpur. He also studied Odissi and Bharata Natyam under Ramli Ibrahim and Classical ballet with Lee Yu Pin. His main dance education was under the renowned dance maestro Padma Shri Adyar K. Lakshman in Chennai, India.

Khoo also trained at the Cunningham Studios in New York City in the Cunningham technique and furthered his ballet training with Michael Beare, Marian St. Claire, Nancy Kilgour and Ayumi Hikasa in London.

== Career ==
He has collaborated and danced with some of the major choreographers of today including Akram Khan, Wayne McGregor and Christopher Bannerman. He has danced as guest artist with Shobana Jeyasingh Dance Company, Ballet de Zaragoza, Ballet Regensburgh and Sankalapam.

He has been commissioned by the Royal Opera House (ROH2), Akademi, National Youth Dance Company, The Jazz Company, South Bank Centre in the UK to create work. He has also made commissioned work for the Canada Dance Festival.

He stands today as one of the leading international male solo Bharata Natyam performers dancing in India and throughout the world. He also creates new work that challenges notions of gender and ambiguity. He has been a British Council scholar having studied his postgraduate studies in choreography at Middlesex University, London. He is one of few leading performers today that has developed academia alongside practice in performance.
