= Khanaporn Janjirdsak =

Khanaporn "Aum" Janjirdsak (Thai: คณพร "อุ้ม" จันทร์เจิดศักดิ์) is a Thai chef and restauranteur, owner of Trang Ko'e (Thai: ตรัง โคอิ), a private chef's table restaurant in Trang, Thailand, specializing in Peranakan cuisine.

== Early life ==
Khanaporn was born into a Thai Peranakan family in Trang province. Her great-grandfather moved to Trang from Fujian province, China to work on a pepper farm.

== Career ==
Khanaporn opened Trang Ko'e, known for serving dishes such as o-aew, yam mii hun, and tumi curry. She is a culinary historian focused on the origins of Thai Peranakan cuisine, particularly in the country's southern region. In 2025, she represented Trang province in the Pakk Taii Design Week 2025 "TRANG O Cha: Taste of Trang Design Exhibition".
