= National Intangible Cultural Heritage of Indonesia =

Indonesian culture

Intangible Cultural Heritage of Indonesia

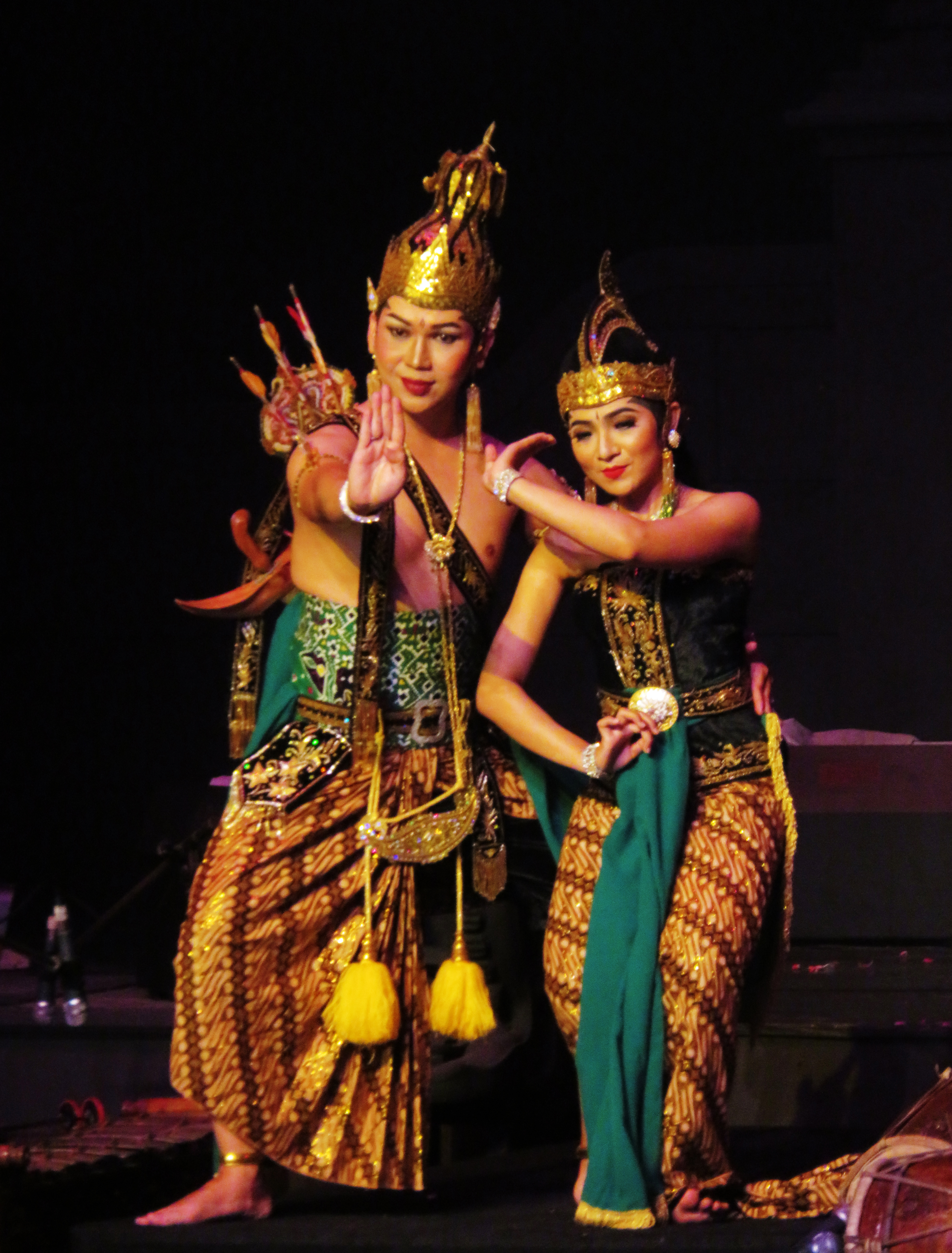
Rama and Shinta in Wayang Wong of Ramayana Ballet performance near Prambanan temple complex

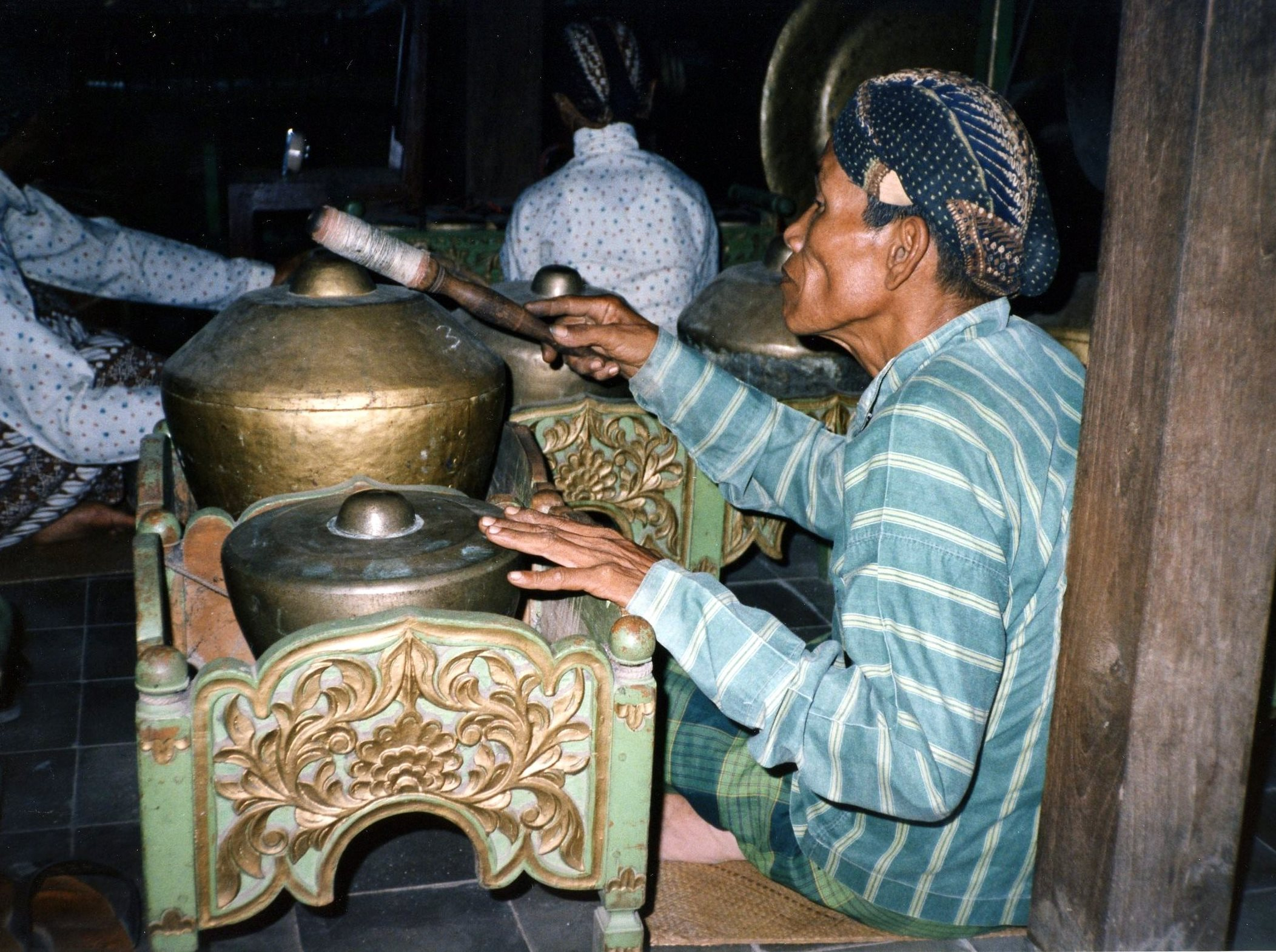
Gamelan, Indonesian traditional musical instruments

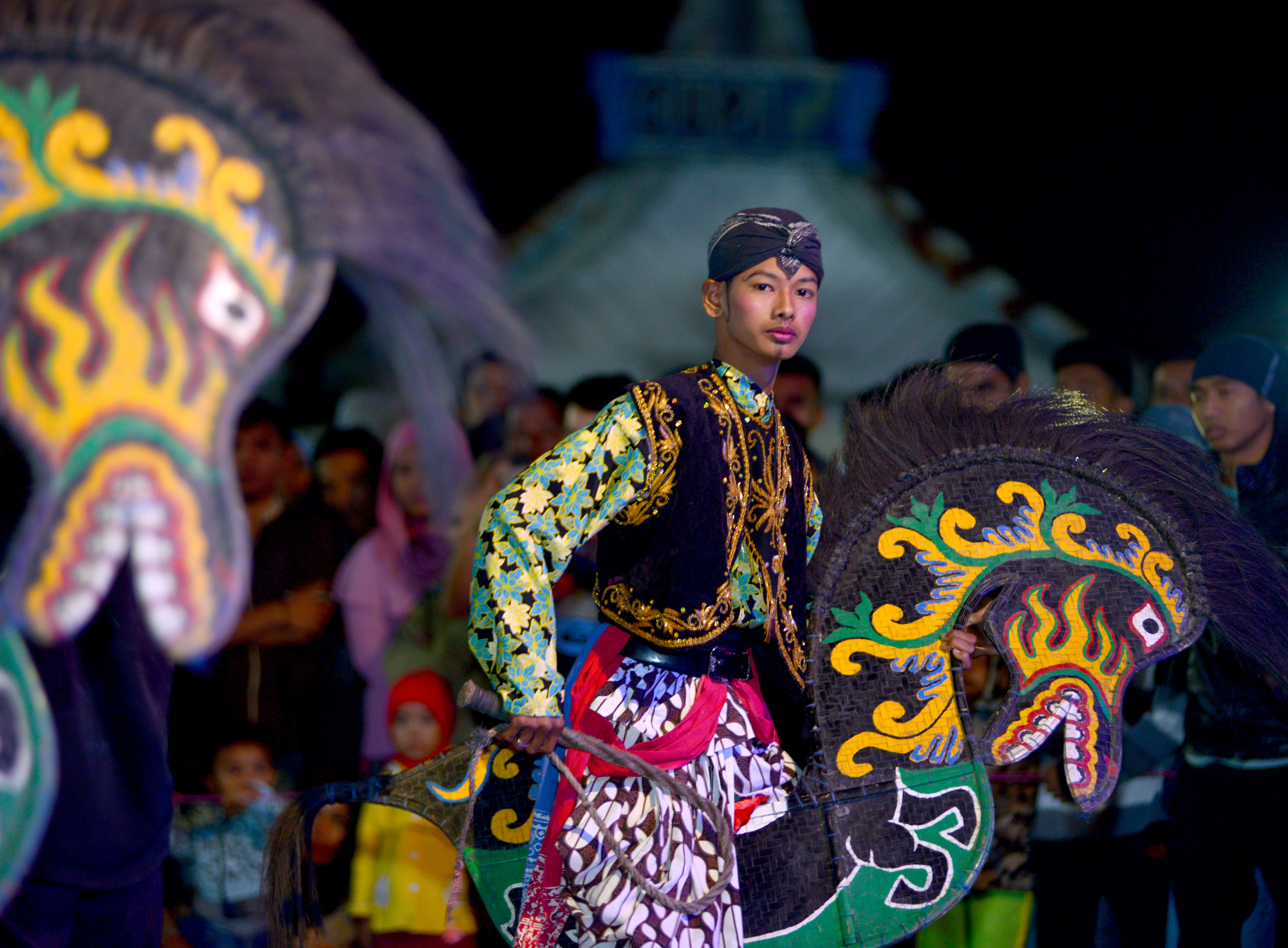
Kuda lumping, one of 3000 traditional Indonesian dances

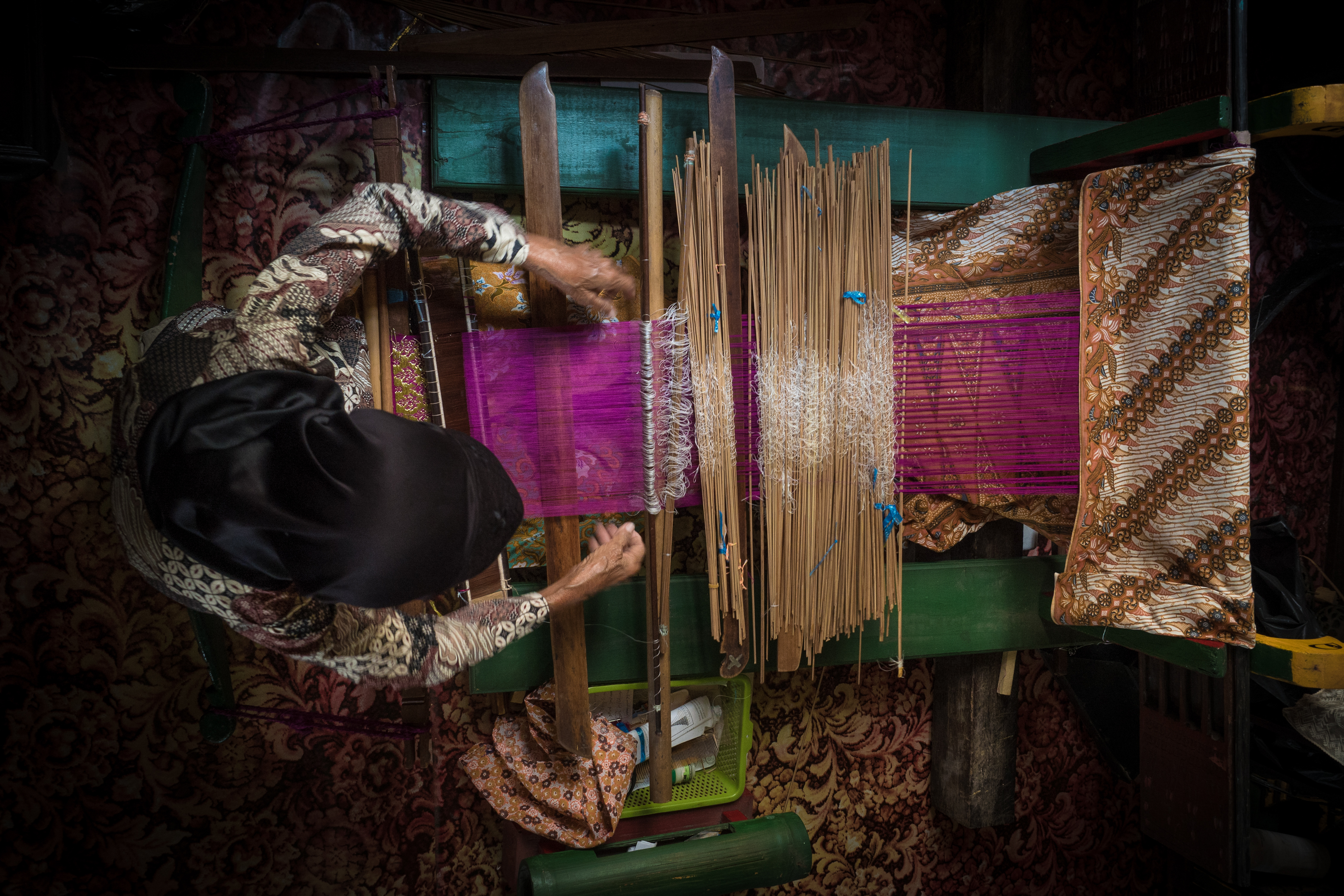
Tenun, Indonesian weaving art (Inc. ulos, ikat, songket, tapis and others)

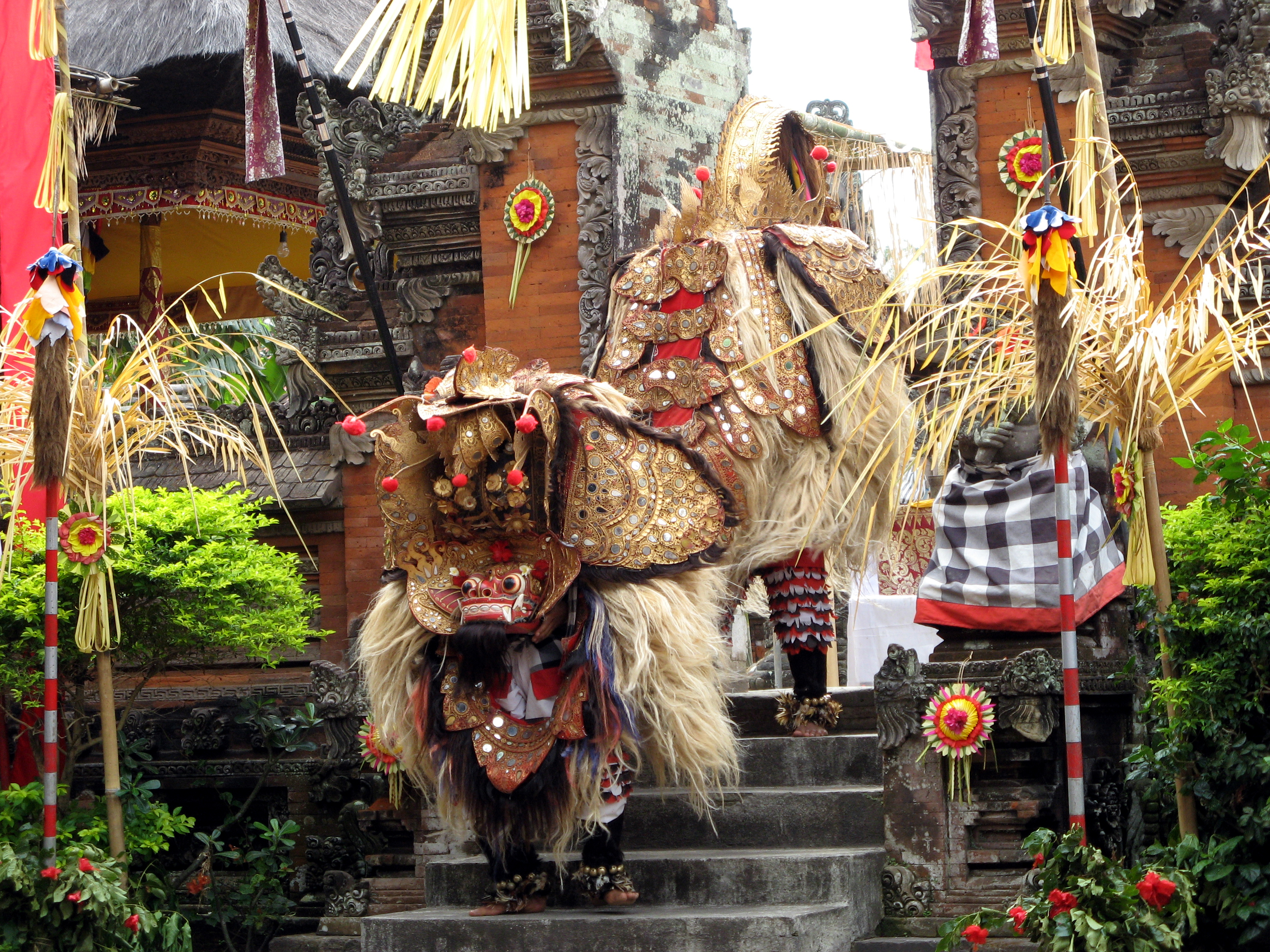
Barong, one of Indonesia's traditional mythological creatures

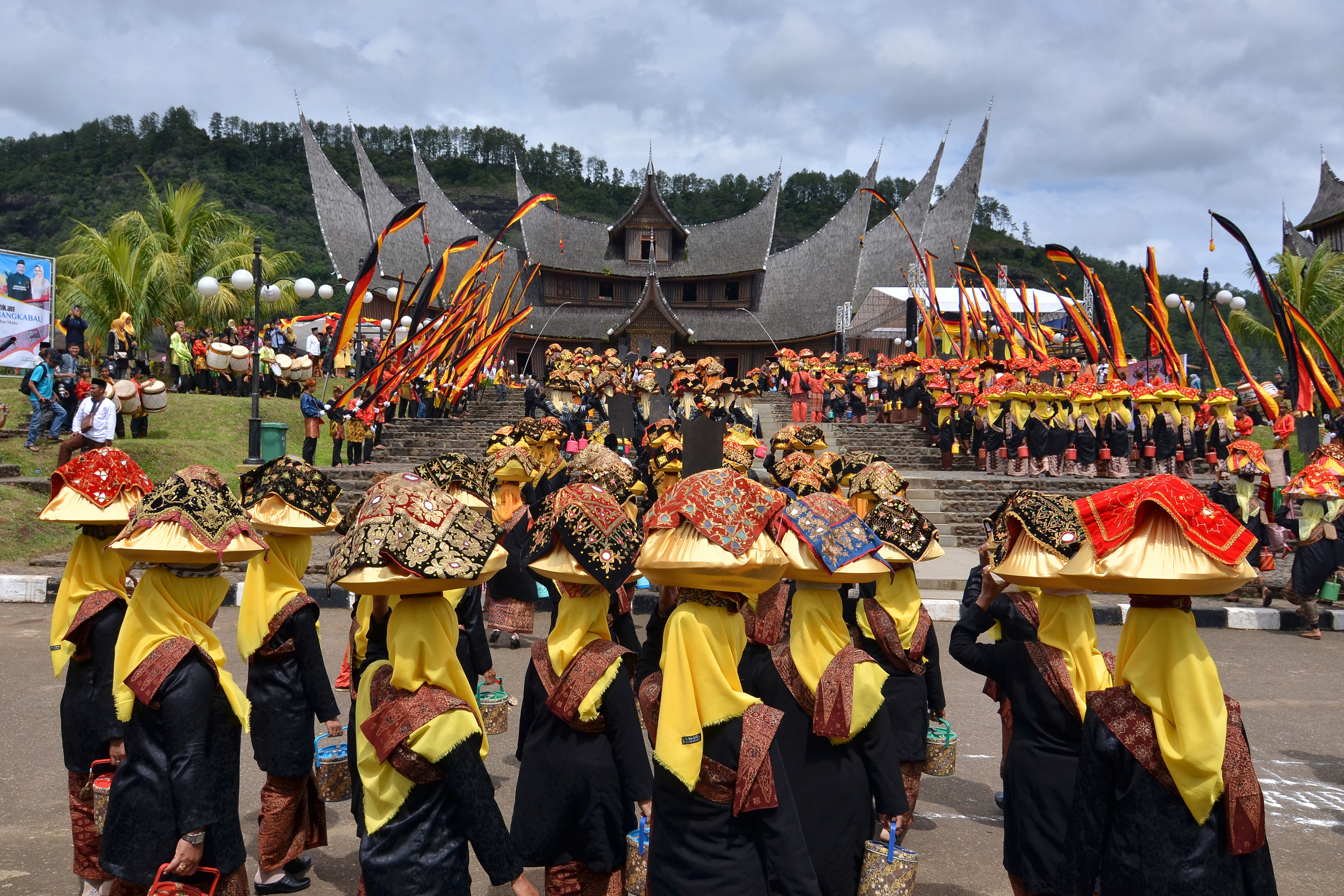
Pagaruyung Palace. This architecture is inspired by the shape of a buffalo horn

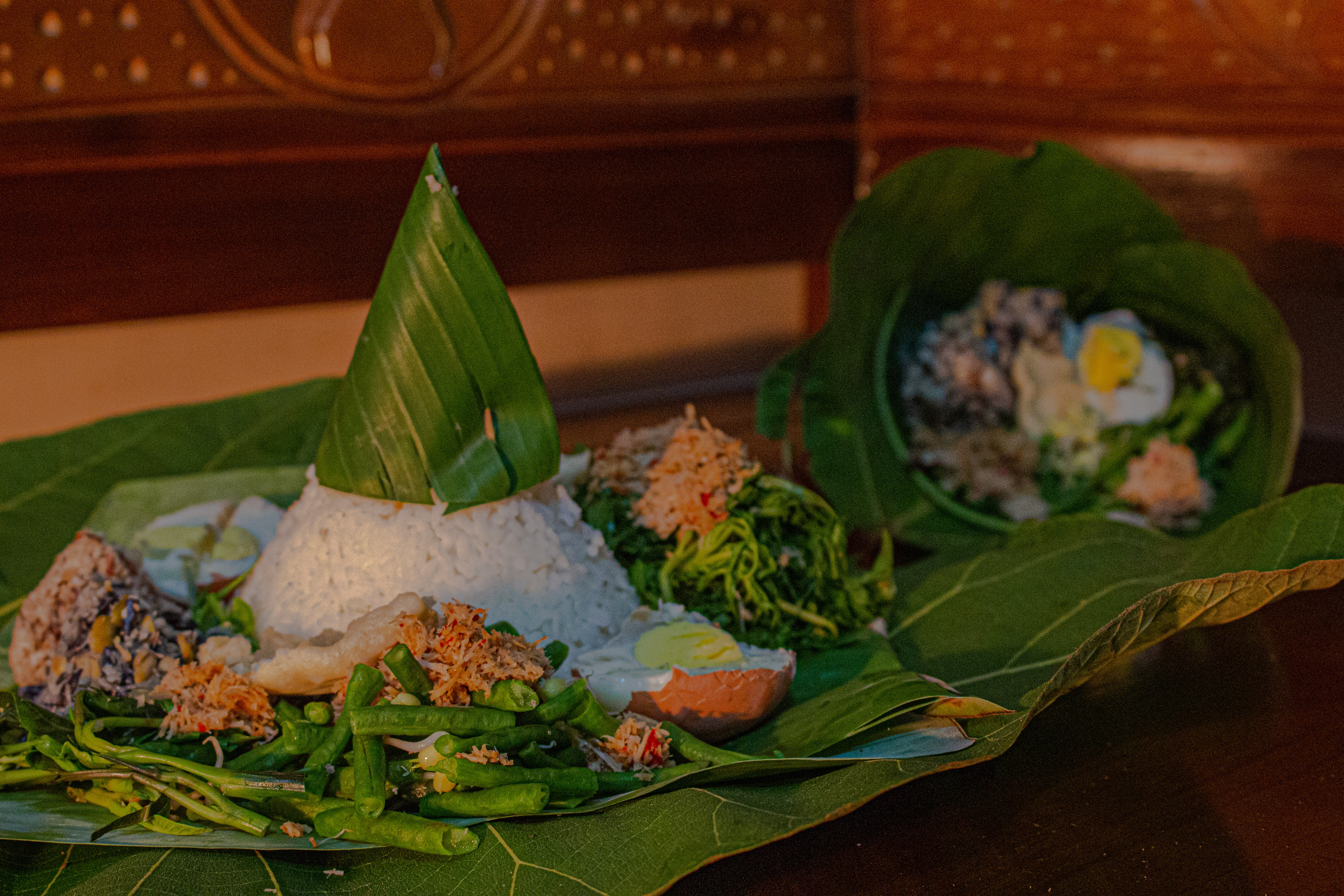
Tumpeng, National dish of Indonesia

The National Intangible Cultural Heritage of Indonesia is a "living culture" that contains philosophical elements from the traditions of society and is still handed down from generation to generation. Edi Sedyawati (in the introduction to the Intangible Cultural Heritage Seminar, 2002) added an important element in the notion of intangible cultural heritage is the nature of culture that cannot be held (abstract), such as concepts and technology, its nature can pass and disappear in time with the times such as language, music, dance, ceremony, and various other structured behaviors. Thus, cultural heritage is shared by a community or community and experiences development from generation to generation, in the flow of a tradition. The Ministry of Education and Culture of Indonesia records and establishes a list of intangible cultural heritage. As of June 2020, a total of 9,770 cultural heritages have been recorded and 1,086 of them have been designated.

== Law ==
The legal basis for the activities of recording, stipulating, and nominating the Intangible Cultural Heritage is as follows:

1. Law Number 28 of 2014 concerning Copyright (State Gazette of the Republic of Indonesia of 2014 Number 266, Supplement to the State Gazette of the Republic of Indonesia Number 5599);
2. Presidential Regulation of the Republic of Indonesia Number 78 of 2007 concerning Ratification of the UNESCO Convention for the Safeguarding of the Intangible Cultural Heritage of 2003 (Convention for the Protection of Intangible Cultural Heritage);
3. Presidential Regulation Number 7 of 2015 concerning Educational Organizations and State Ministries;
4. Presidential Regulation Number 14 of 2015 concerning the Ministry of Education and Culture;
5. Presidential Decree Number 121/P of 2014 concerning the Establishment of Ministries and the Appointment of Ministers of the Working Cabinet for the 2014-2019 Period;
6. Decree of the President of the Republic of Indonesia Number 42 of 2002 concerning Guidelines for the Implementation of the State Revenue and Expenditure Budget (State Gazette of the Republic of Indonesia of 2002 Number 73, Supplement to the State Gazette of the Republic of Indonesia Number 4212), as last amended by Presidential Decree Number 72 of 2004 concerning Amendments to Decisions the President Number 42 of 2002 concerning Guidelines for the Implementation of the State Revenue and Expenditure Budget (State Gazette of the Republic of Indonesia of 2004 Number 92);
7. Regulation of the Minister of Education and Culture Number 1 of 2012 concerning Organization and Work Procedure of the Ministry of Education and Culture as last amended by Regulation of the Minister of Education and Culture Number 25 of 2014 (State Gazette of the Republic of Indonesia of 2014 Number 459);
8. Regulation of the Minister of Education and Culture Number 106 of 2013 concerning Indonesian Intangible Cultural Heritage;

== Background ==
Referring to the 2003 UNESCO convention on safeguarding of intangible cultural heritage called Intangible Cultural Heritage divided into five domains, each domain and its explanation, among others:

=== Performing Arts ===
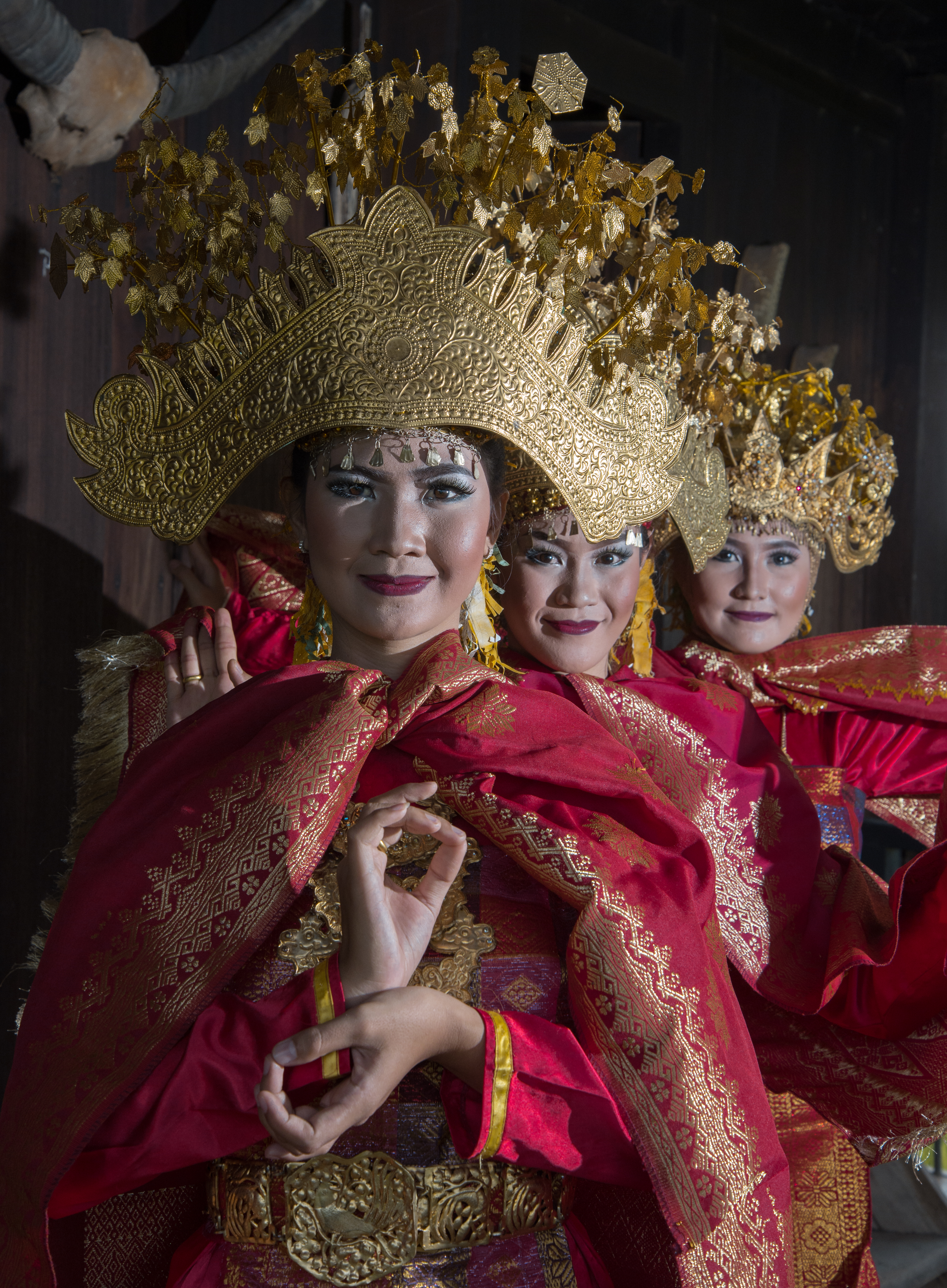
Kebagh dance, traditional dance of South Sumatra

Performing arts consist of:

1. Dance: movement patterns (concentric, spreading); dancer (gender), location (palace, sacred building, field); accompaniment music (gamelan / gambelan, gendrang, a cappella); costumes (clothing colors, accessories, clothing motifs); lighting (blencong, torch, oncor, etc.); composition (group, individual, mix, etc.); purpose (sacred, profane); type; and dance forms;
2. Sound Art: singer, poetry, song lyrics, tone system, instruments, location, time, clothing, genre (type);
3. Art of Music: musical instruments, types of music, tone systems, goals, players, rules of playing musical instruments, assemblies (a combination of all musical components);
4. Theater Arts: stage, performers, plays, costumes, time, location, musical instruments, lighting.

=== Traditions and Oral Expressions ===
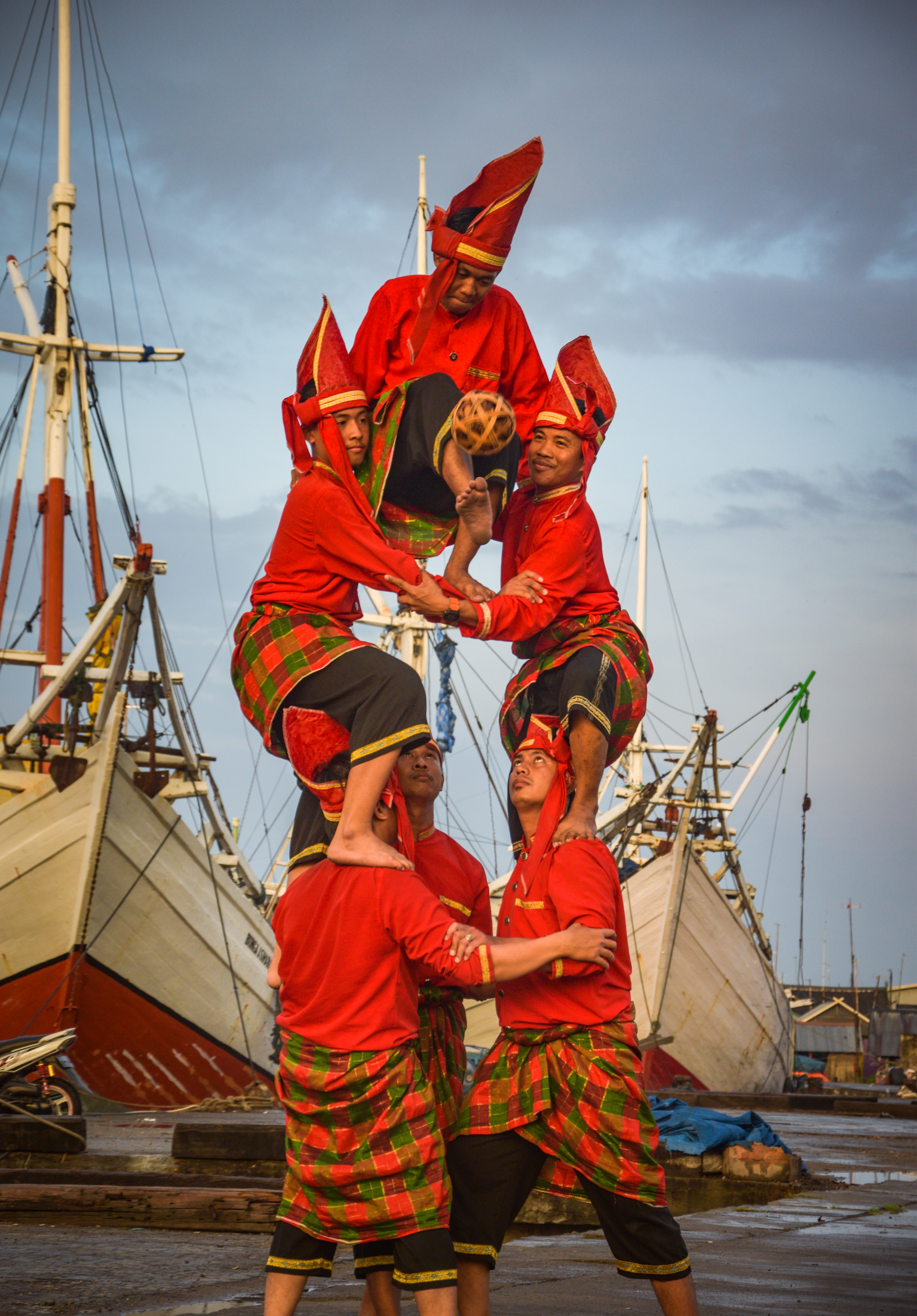
Paraga or Maraga, the Bugis and Makassar version of sepak raga

Cultural works included in Traditions and Oral Expressions are:

1. Language: alphabet, dialect, grammar, speech act, language level
2. Ancient Manuscripts: in the form of books, chronicles, written on material (stone, copper, palm-leaf, bark-daluwang, bamboo), scripts, archives (charter, chronicles, post-service memory, ROC-OV, KV), language and writing that is not used anymore, and images in the manuscript. Ancient manuscripts can be in the form of books, letters of agreement, family letters, personal letters, scriptures, primbons, collection of songs
3. Traditional Games and Sports: functions (entertainment and leisure use, religious games, fitness); form of play (sparring and non-sparring); type of game (such as: takraw -aga, kite, kite); rules of the game (number of players, moves, win-lose, order); player characteristics (male, female, small child, adult, old, young, married, not yet); clothing when playing (sarong, headband); play time (afternoon, evening, night, big day, full moon); game materials (earthenware, bamboo, wood, leaf); and the location of the game (like on the beach, on the field, on an open yard)
4. Pantun: the contents of the poem, the rhymes of the poem, the grammar spoken, when it is read, the rules of reading it, the location, who is reciting, the purpose of being recited in the form of gurindam, poetry, song, poetry, poetry, pojian (religious praise), syi'ir (syllabic ( religious songs), hymns.
5. Folk Story: the contents of the story, grammar, moral and meaning of the story contained, in the form of fairy tales, myth, legend, folklore, fable, epic;
6. Mantra (influence of local culture): language spoken, when it was read, rules for reading it, location, who read it, taboos and suggestions, goals;
7. Prayer (influence of religion): language spoken, when it was read, rules for reading it, location, who read it, taboos and suggestions, goals;
8. Folk song: playing, when, who (gender, stratum), location, song lyrics, accompaniment and a cappella music, order of presentation. taksu, bissu.

=== Community Customs, Rites, and Celebrations ===
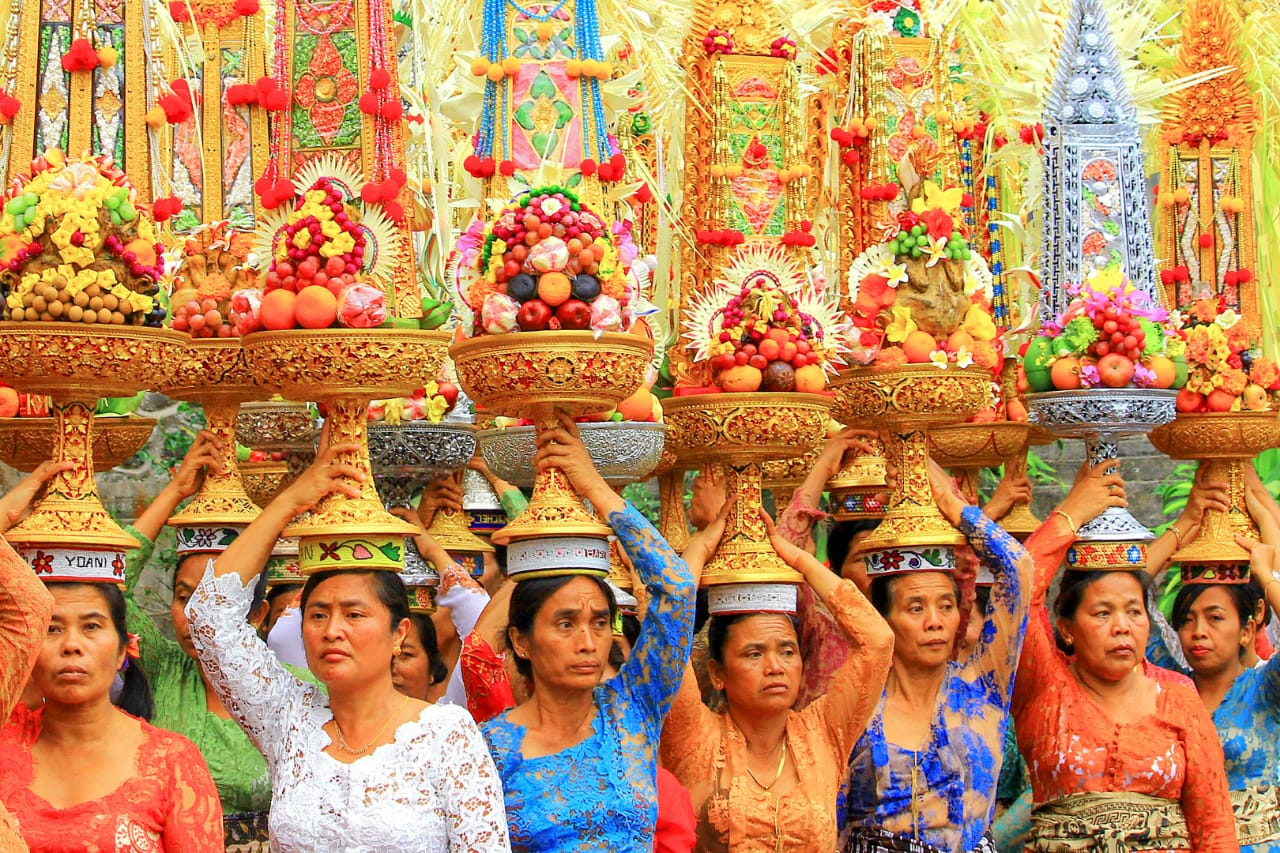
Bali is famous for its rich and colourful culture, Hindu festivals and dances

Community Customs, Rites, and Celebrations, consisting of:

1. Traditional ceremony: individual life cycle (birth, initiation, marriage, death) and collective life cycle (cleansing the village, nyadran); purpose (sacred, reject); location (mountain, beach / coast, river, spring); participants (individuals, families, communities); time (religious calendar, harvest time, sea time); rules (restrictions and recommendations), the order of the ceremony (the stages of the implementation of ceremonial activities); completeness (offerings, accessories, equipment);
2. Customary law: Content (who issues, who is regulated, what is regulated, the form of the rules and adat sanctions)
3. Social Organization System: leadership (adat, village, religion, government); structure (hierarchy); customary rules (restrictions and recommendations); social organization area (subak, banjar, wanua, banua)
4. Traditional Kinship System: Types of kinship, hierarchy, relationships between hierarchies, rules of kinship
5. Traditional Economic System: market based on the market (pound, kliwon, legi, wage); market based on days (Sunday, Monday, Tuesday, Wednesday, Thursday, Friday, Saturday); barter (exchanging catches and crops, renting houses with agricultural produce), bargaining, method of payment (cash, installments, auction, bonded labor, slash);
6. Traditional Festival: destination (sacred, reject); location (mountain, beach / coast, river, spring); participants (individuals, families, communities); time (religious calendar, harvest time, sea time); rules (restrictions and recommendations), the order of the festival (the stages of the implementation of festival activities); completeness (offerings, accessories, equipment), organizer / committee;

=== Knowledge and Habits of Behavior Regarding Nature and the Universe ===
Javanese traditional kirab procession bringing Dewi Sri image made from rice

Knowledge and Habits of Behavior Regarding Nature and the Universe, consisting of:

1. Knowledge about nature, (microcosm, macrocosm, adaptation, natural processing); Cosmology (astrology; date; navigation);
2. Local Wisdom: disaster mitigation (cultural-based disaster risk reduction), ecological conservation, harmony of life, tolerance;
3. Traditional Medicine: healing options, treatment techniques, treatment materials, healers (sanro, herbalists, sekerei, suwanggi, belian, psychics, orang pintar, physicians, sinshes); etiology of the disease (factors causing disease).

=== Traditional Crafts Skills and Proficiency ===
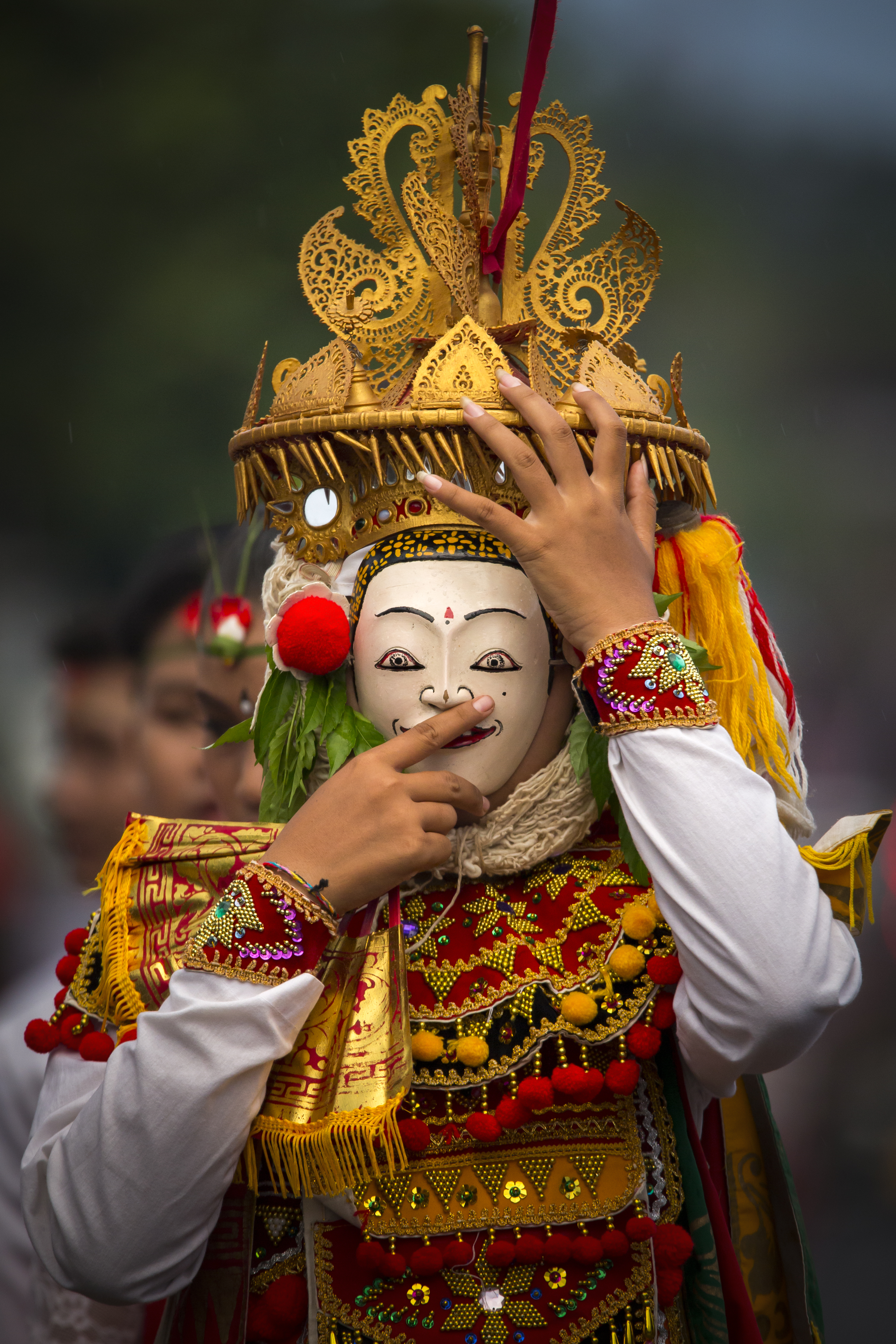
Topeng art

Traditional Crafts Skills and Proficiency, consisting of

1. Traditional Technology (manufacturing process, design and construction, how tools work, objectives, importance of technology for the surrounding community)
2. Traditional Architecture (building design guidance, anthropometrics - building sizes based on the human body - fathoms, inch, yelp, rare); anthropomorphic (building forms based on the human body); building based on decorative motifs; maker (pandrita lopi, pande); the direction of the building (kaja-kelod, luan-teben); division of page functions (jaba; jaba-middle; jero); division of function space; buildings are determined by status (jahe -julu).
3. Traditional Clothing: (philosophy of form, material, decoration, color, type of accessories); user status; time and procedure for use; function (sacred, profane); user gender
4. Traditional Accessories: (philosophy of shape, material, design, color); user status; the location of usage; user gender; time and procedure for use; function (sacred, profane);
5. Traditional Crafts: materials (clay, wood, fabric, iron, stone, rattan, sticks, bamboo); tooling; craftsmen (pande sikek, gozali); handiwork (crafts, embroidery, plaiting, pottery, weaving); workmanship techniques (knitting, forging, woven, carving, weaving)
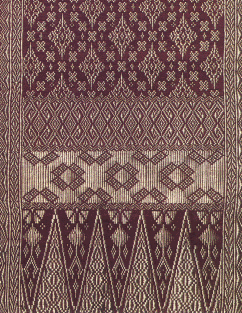
  Songket
6. Traditional cuisine: recipes (randang, porridge tinutuan, warm, cone); food ingredients (animal, plant); process (barapen - burnt stone -, boiled, fumigated, fermented, cooked with sand, roasted, burned, steamed, steamed, combustion with mud media); cook (male or female; old or young), time of presentation (morning, afternoon, evening, transitional ceremony, religious ceremony, state / royal ceremony), location of presentation (religious buildings, palaces, sacred areas, government buildings, mountains, sea, forest), presentation procedures (appetizers, core food, desserts), destinations (sacred, profane), serving media (shell, ongke, earthenware, leaves, plaits, shells, metal / brass containers); the meaning of food (restoring enthusiasm, success, purity), cooking utensils (steaming, frying pan, stove, brazier, sutil, scoop, irus), how to eat (using hands or using tools).
7. Media of Transportation: knowledge about animals that can be used for transportation (horses: have origins - salasila horses -); knowledge of making modes of transportation (dokar, cart, colic, pinisi, sope-sope, padewakang)
8. Traditional Weapons: philosophy of making weapons (legitimacy of origin); materials (metal, iron, wood, leather, bamboo, rattan), functions and roles (security, preaching, authority, supernatural powers, substitution of masculine identities, symbols of war, surrender, humiliation); makers (masters, undagi, pande), weapons users, procedures for use (abstinence / prohibition on the use of weapons and recommendations), time (holidays, religious celebrations, when there is a disaster - jamasan -), the manufacturing process (forged, granting prestige and warangan, granting warangka, making upstream / holding arms / bees' buttocks, complementing weapons (holsters), ornaments (stones and carvings).

== Indonesia UNESCO's Intangible Cultural Heritage ==
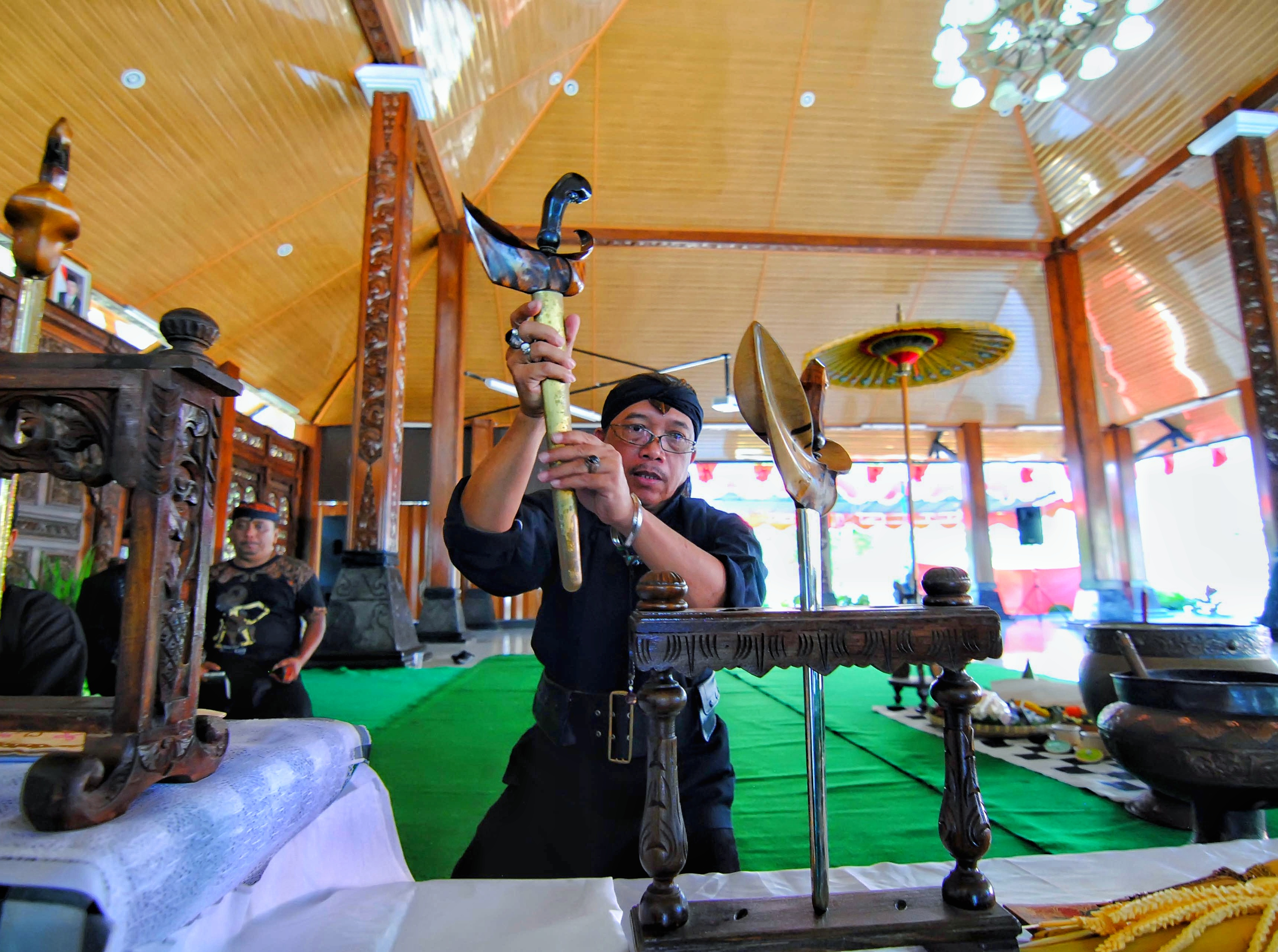
Kris or Keris (2008)

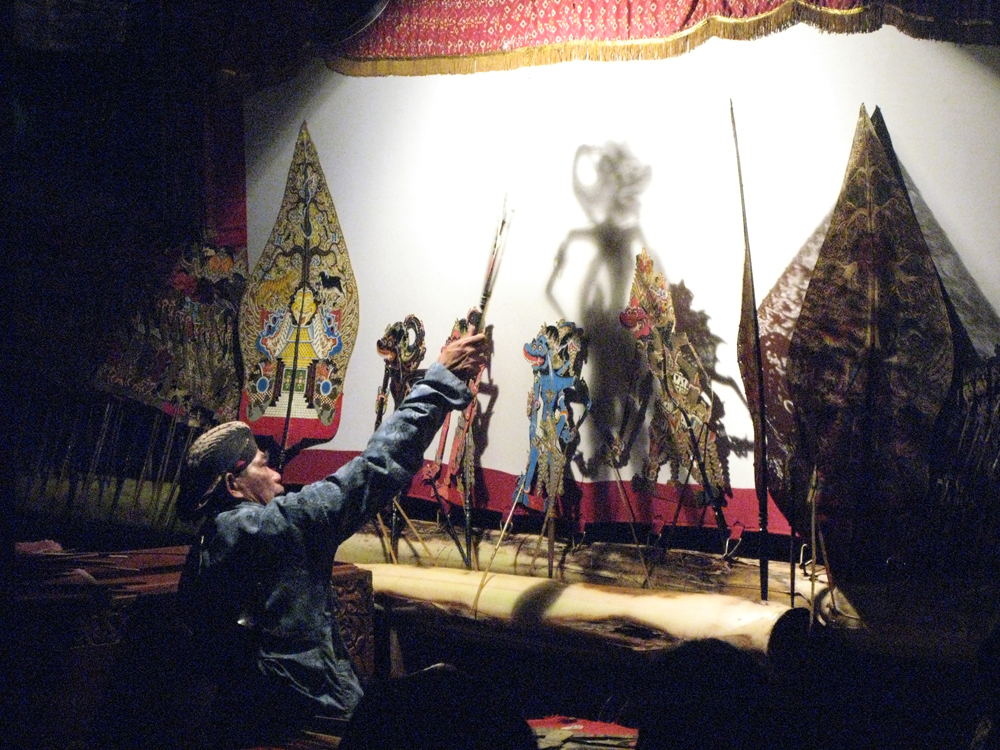
Wayang puppet theatre (2008)

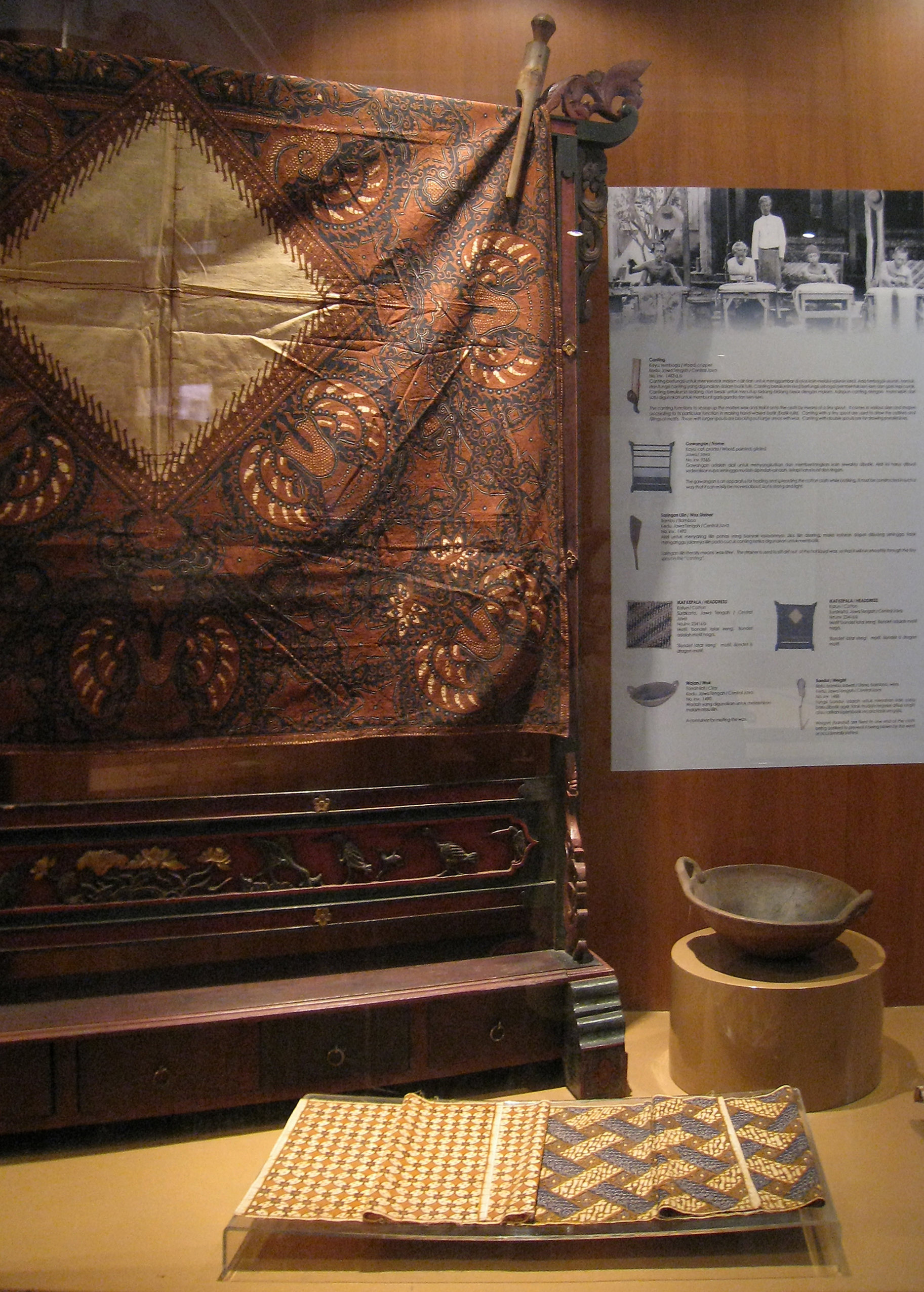
Batik (2009)

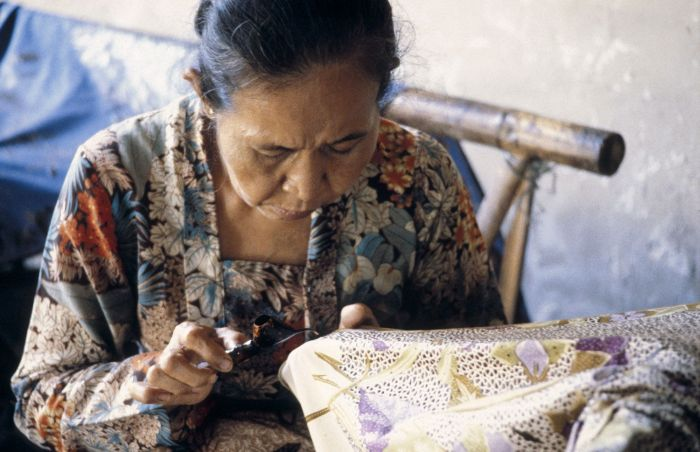
Education and training in Indonesian Batik intangible cultural heritage for elementary, junior, senior, vocational school and polytechnic students, in collaboration with the Batik Museum in Pekalongan (2009)

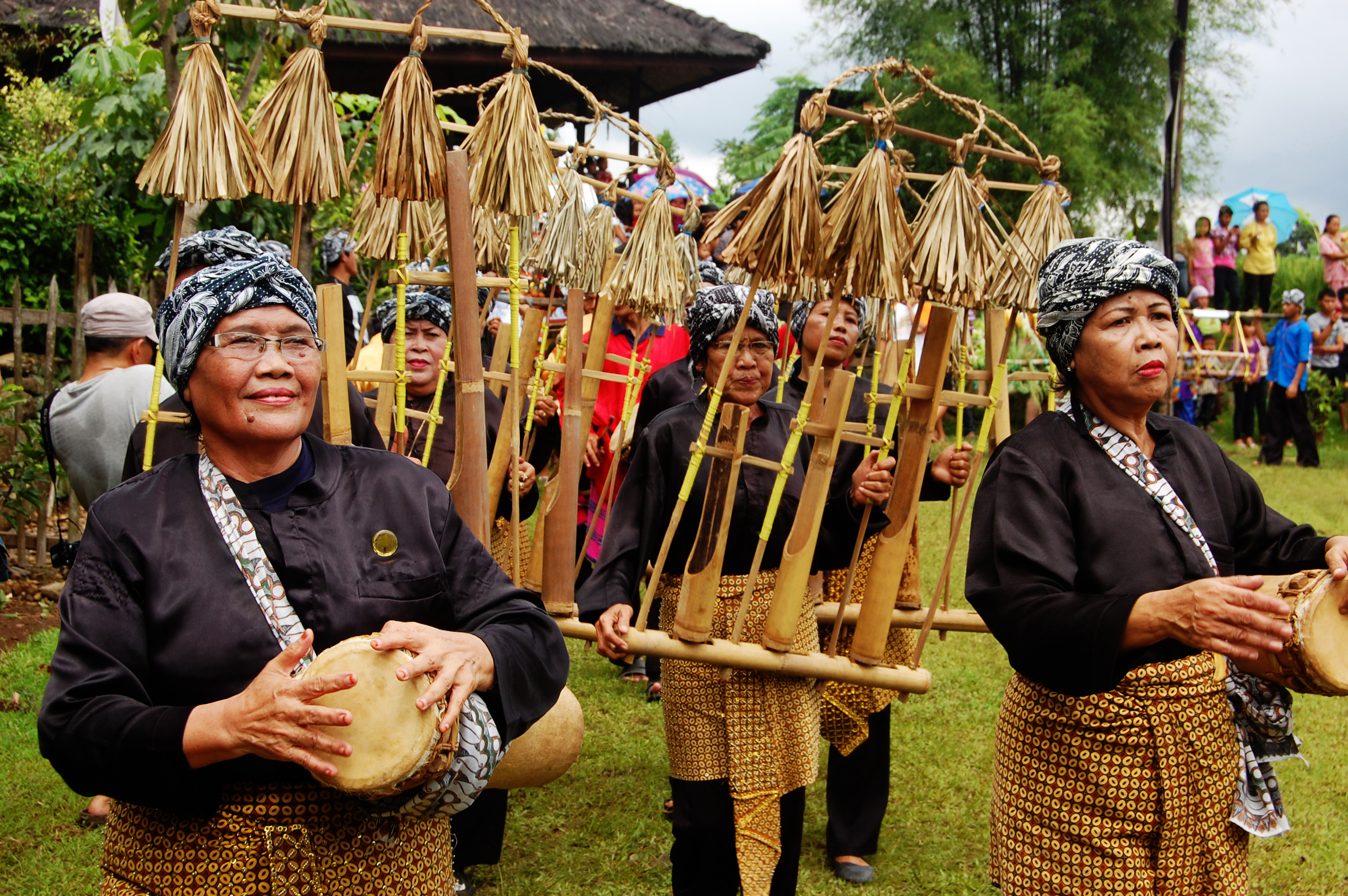
Angklung (2010)

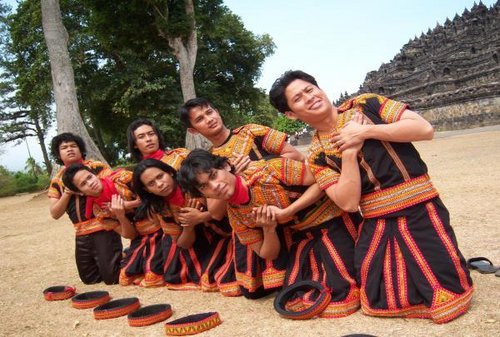
Saman dance (2011)

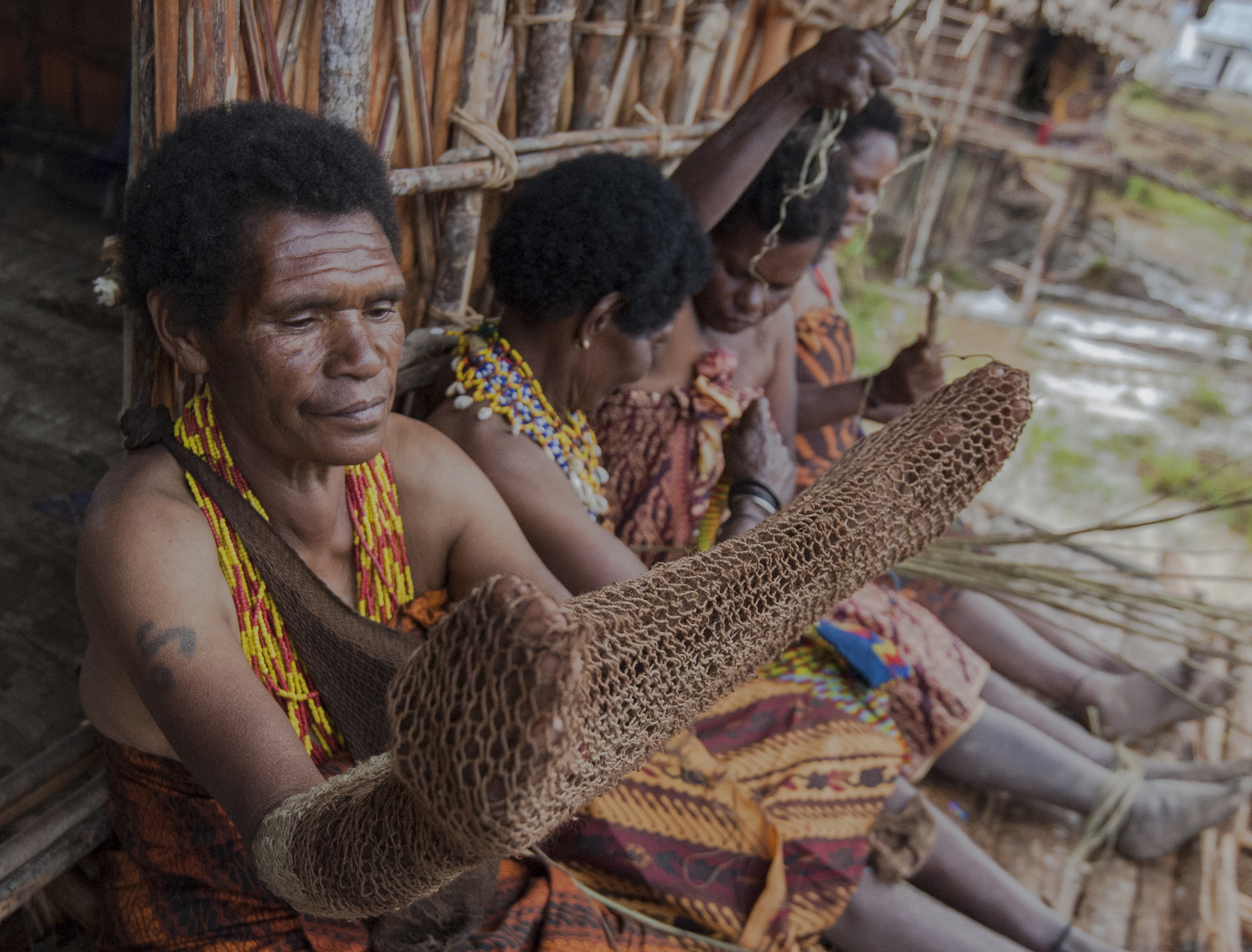
Noken, multifunctional knotted or woven bag, handcraft of the people of Papua (2012)

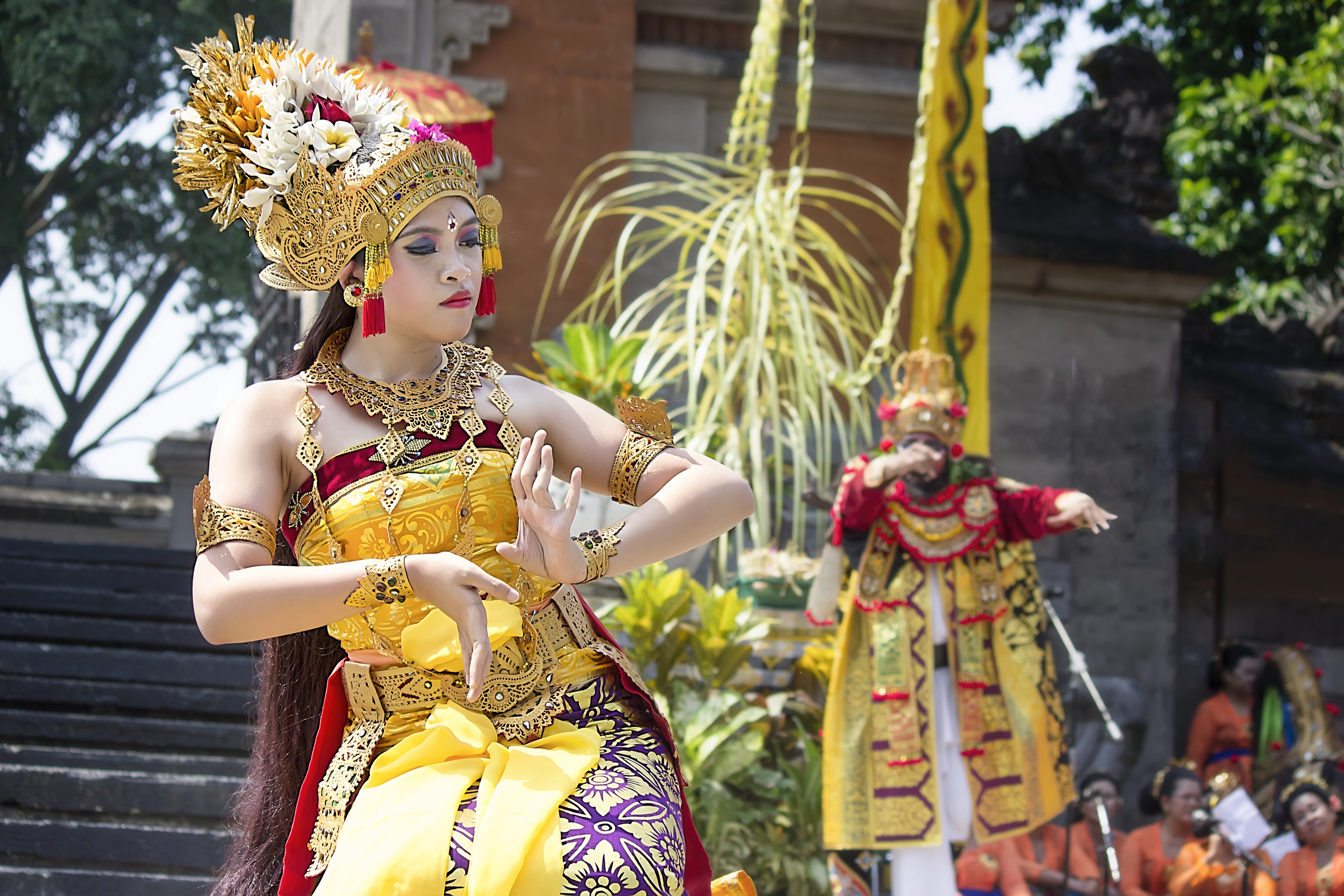
Three genres of traditional dance in Bali (2015)

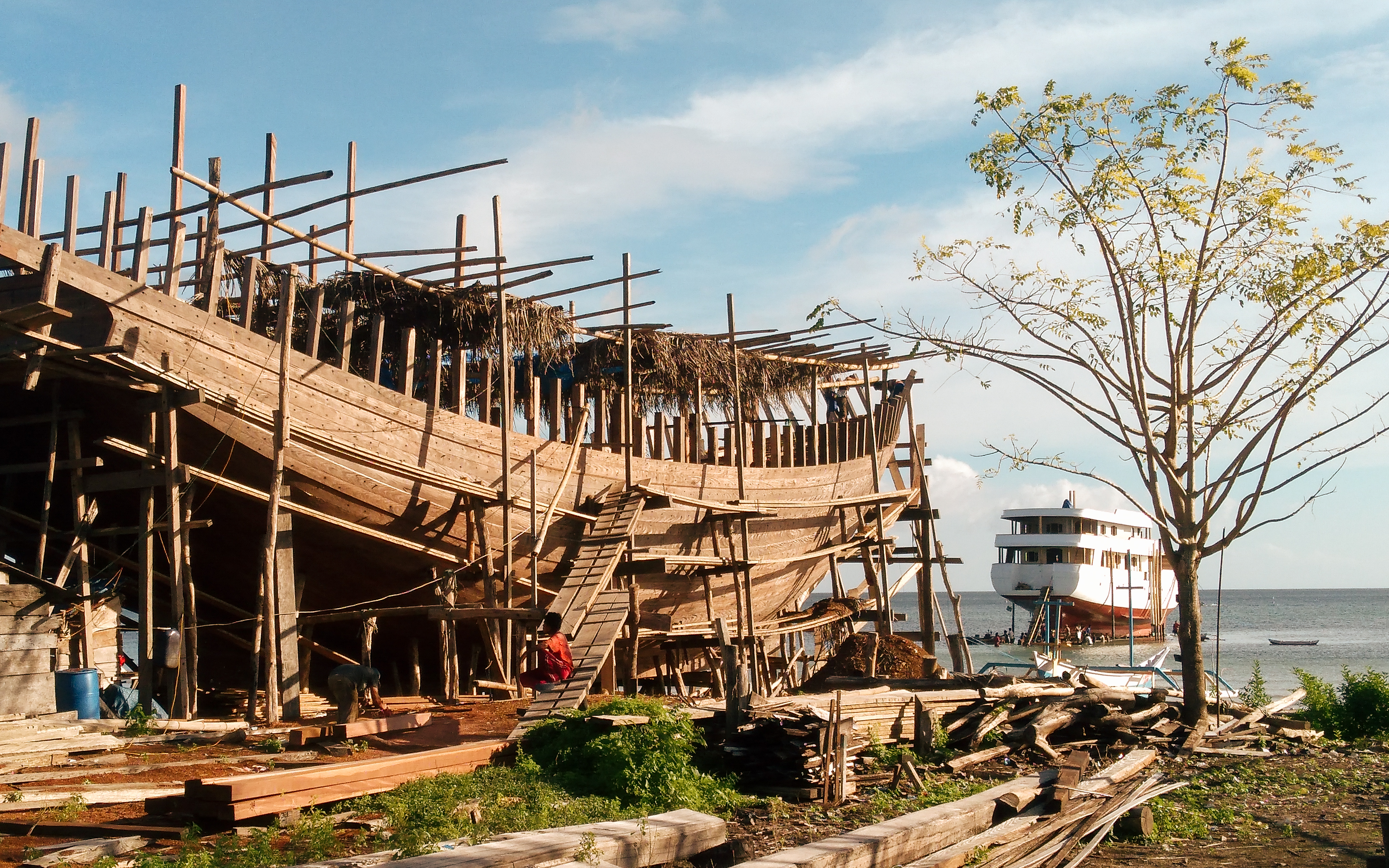
Pinisi, art of boatbuilding in South Sulawesi (2017)

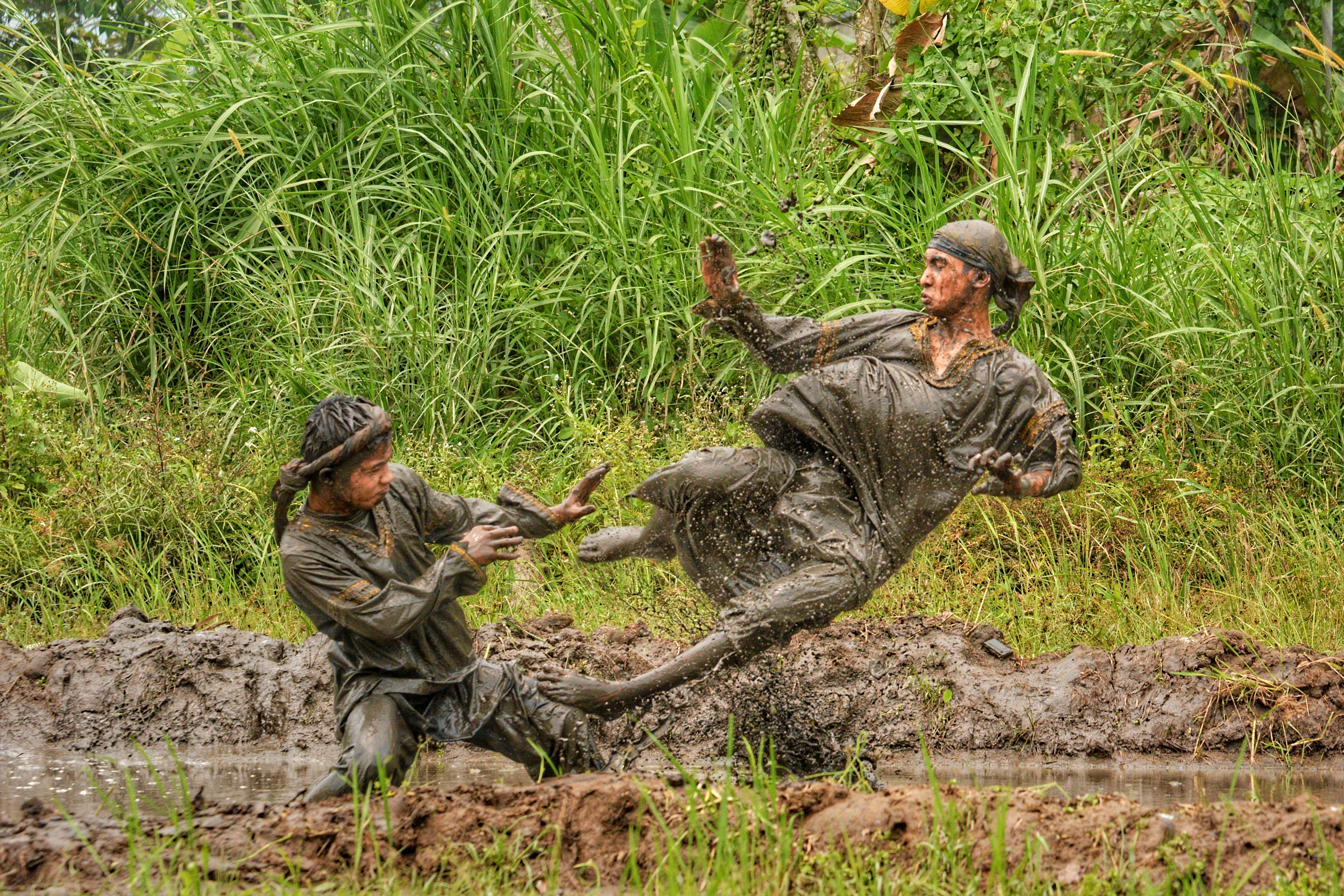
Traditions of Pencak Silat (2019)

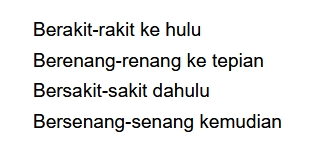
Pantun (2020)

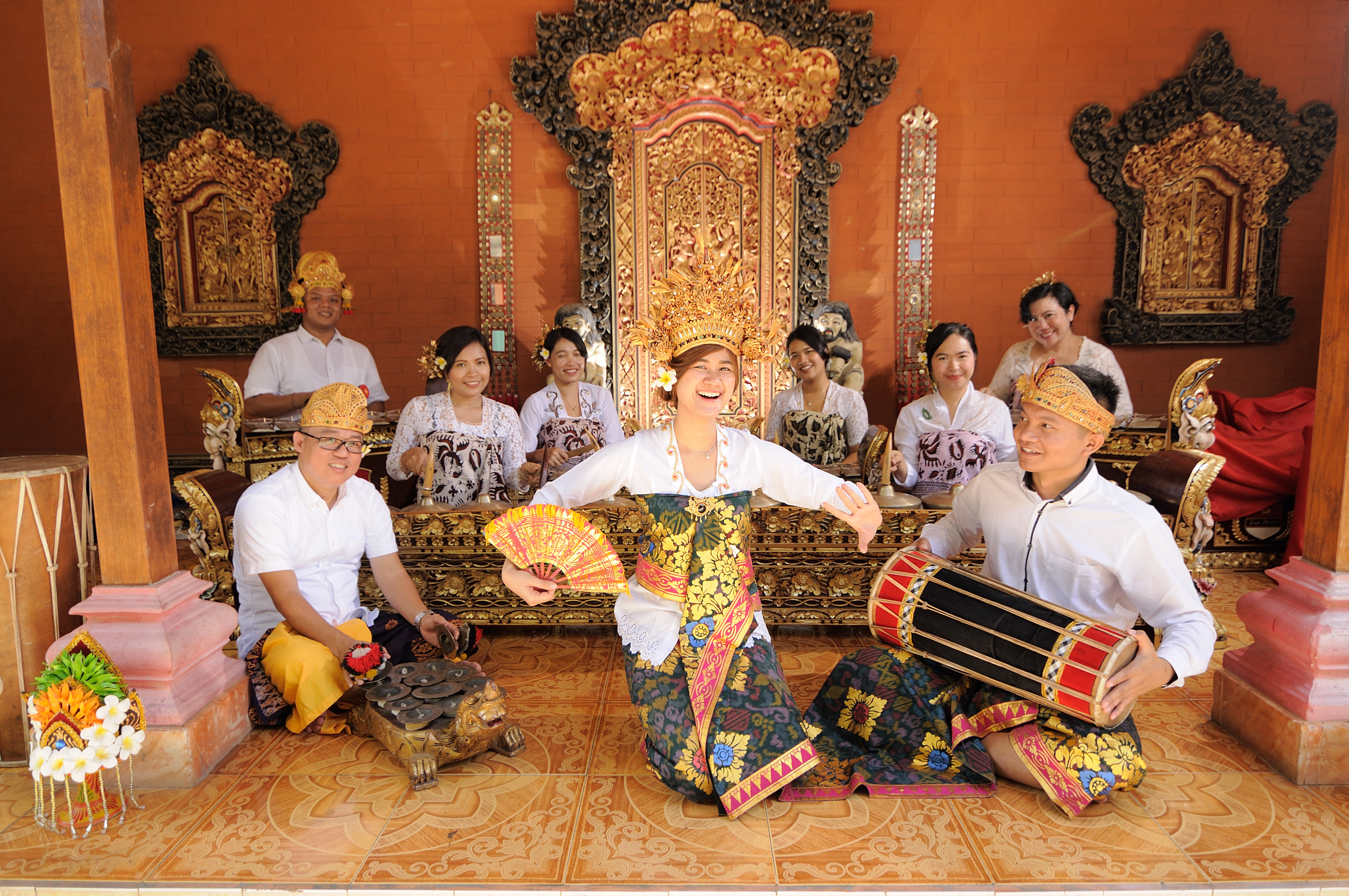
Gamelan (2021)

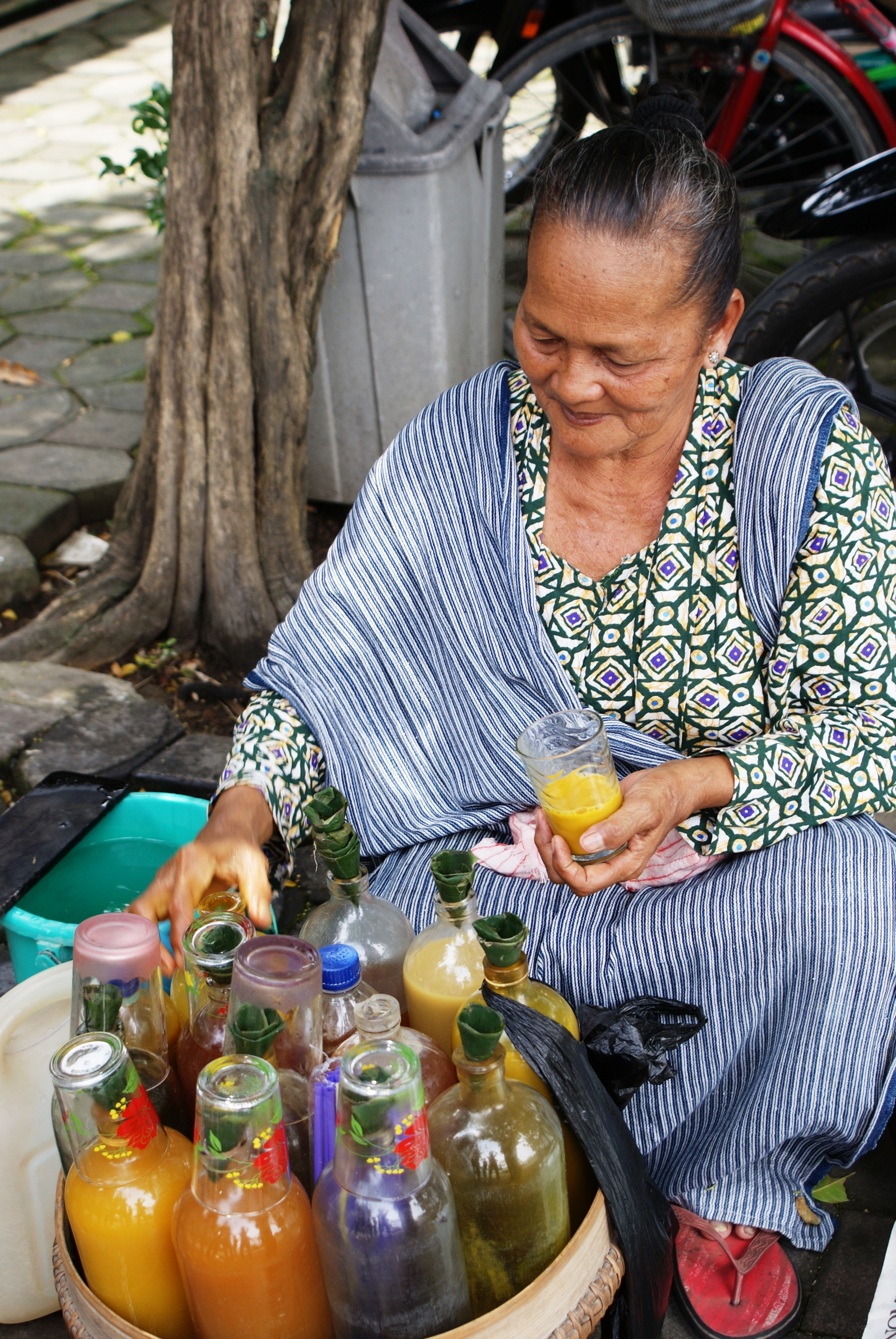
Jamu wellness culture (2023)

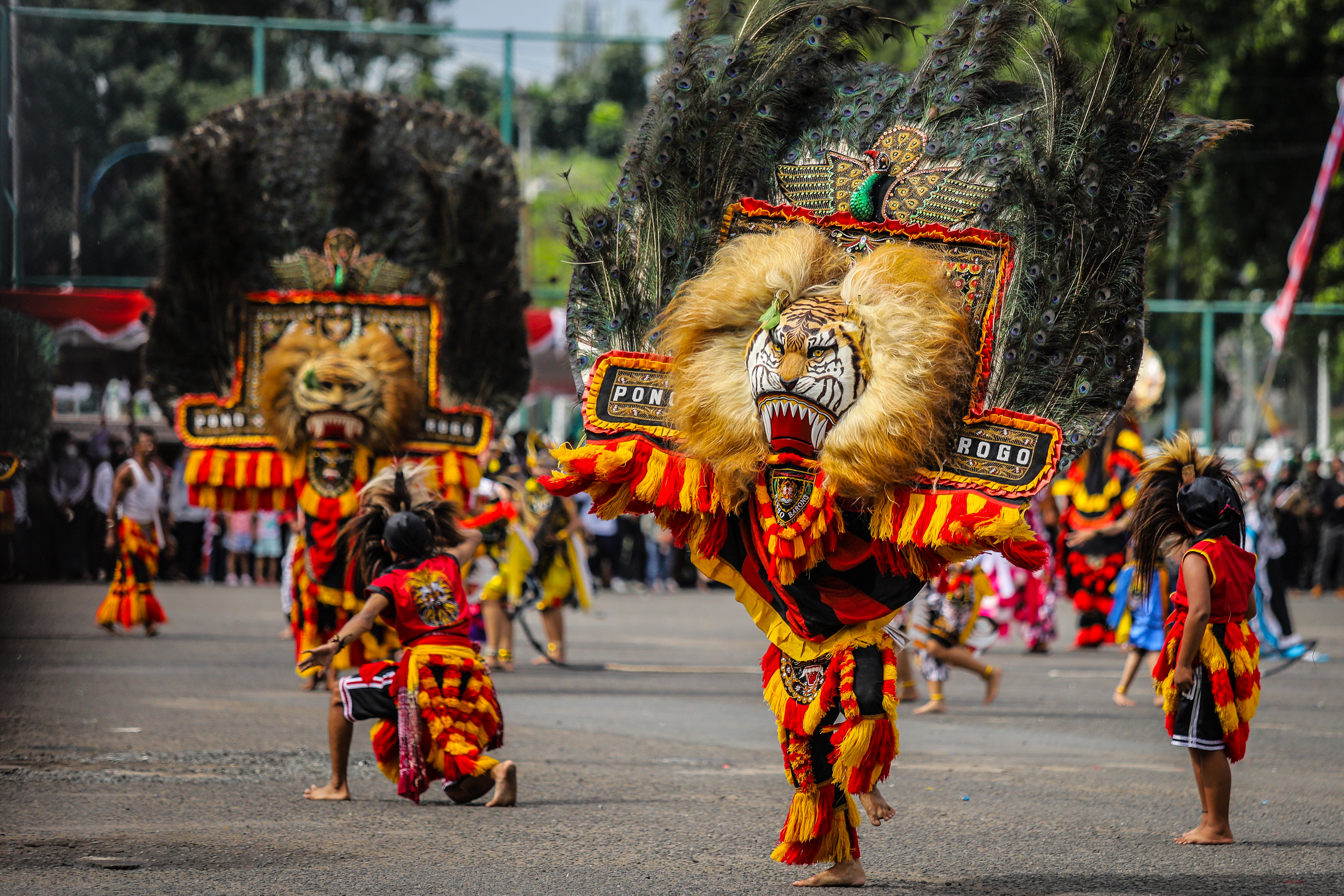
Reog Ponorogo performing art (2024)

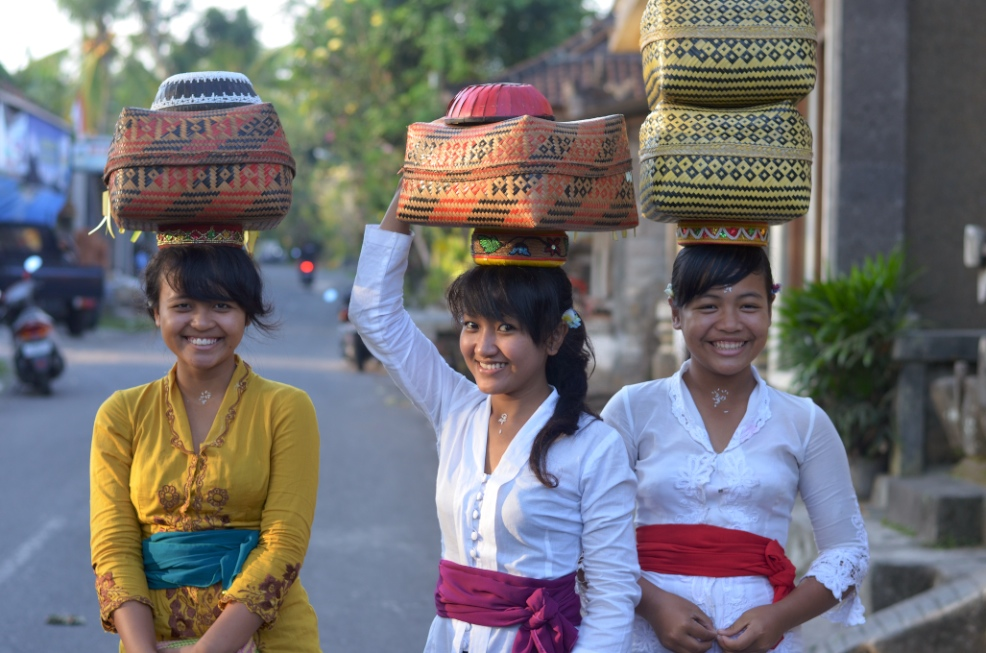
Kebaya: knowledge, skills, traditions and practices (2024)

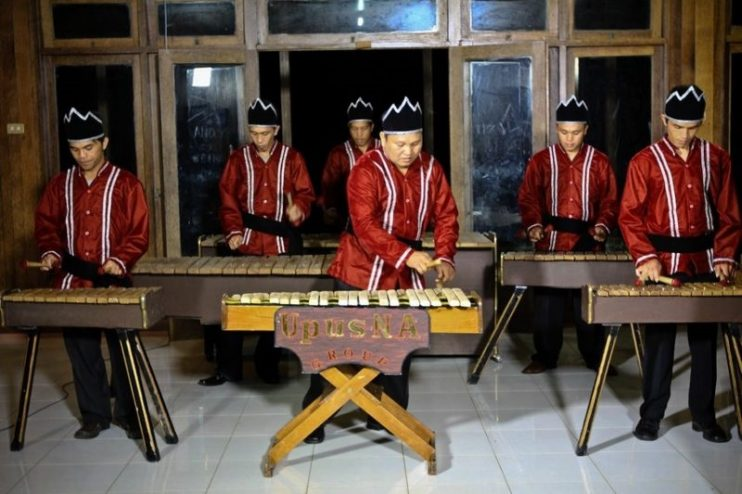
Cultural practices and expressions linked to Balafon and Kolintang in Mali, Burkina Faso, Côte d'Ivoire and Indonesia (2024)

== Lists by province ==
=== Aceh ===
Number of registration	Year	Cultural works	Domain	Image
201300001	2013	Rencong	Traditional Crafts Skills and Proficiency	
201300074	2013	Tari Saman	Performing Arts	
201400078	2014	Didong	Traditions and Oral Expressions	
201400079	2014	Kerawang Gayo	Traditional Crafts Skills and Proficiency	
201400080	2014	Tari Seudati	Performing Arts	
201400081	2014	Rumoh Aceh	Traditional Crafts Skills and Proficiency	
201400082	2014	Kopiah Riman	Traditional Crafts Skills and Proficiency	
201500174	2015	Tari Rapa'i Geleng	Performing Arts	
201500175	2015	Tari Dampeng	Performing Arts	
201500176	2015	Tari Bines	Performing Arts	
201500177	2015	Pinto Aceh	Traditional Crafts Skills and Proficiency	
201500178	2015	Tari Rabbani Wahid	Performing Arts	
201600295	2016	Mak Meugang	Community Customs, Rites, and Celebrations	
201600296	2016	Nandong	Traditions and Oral Expressions	
201600297	2016	Tari Guel	Performing Arts	
201600298	2016	Likok Pulo	Performing Arts	
201600299	2016	Pacu Kude	Traditional Crafts Skills and Proficiency	
201600300	2016	Menatakhken Hinei	Community Customs, Rites, and Celebrations	
201600301	2016	Canang Kayu	Traditional Crafts Skills and Proficiency	
201600302	2016	Maracu	Traditional Crafts Skills and Proficiency	
201700445	2017	Landok Sampot	Performing Arts	
201700446	2017	Rapa'i Pase	Performing Arts	
201700447	2017	Payung Mesikhat	Traditional Crafts Skills and Proficiency	
201700448	2017	Pasenatken	Community Customs, Rites, and Celebrations	
201700449	2017	Grimpheng	Performing Arts	
201800595	2018	Keumamah	Traditional Crafts Skills and Proficiency	
201800596	2018	Laweut	Performing Arts	
201800597	2018	Likee	Traditions and Oral Expressions	
201800598	2018	Hukôm Adat La'ôt	Community Customs, Rites, and Celebrations	
201800599	2018	Kuah Beulangong	Traditional Crafts Skills and Proficiency	
201800600	2018	Keni Gayo	Traditional Crafts Skills and Proficiency	
201800601	2018	Pemamanan	Traditional Customs, Rites, and Celebrations	
201900820	2019	Memek	Traditional Crafts Skills and Proficiency	
201900821	2019	Gutel	Traditional Crafts Skills and Proficiency	
201900822	2019	Tari Sining	Performing Arts	
201900823	2019	Silat Pelintau	Traditions and Oral Expressions	
202001087	2020	Peusijuk	Community Customs, Rites, and Celebrations	
202001088	2020	Keuneunong	Knowledge and Habits of Behavior Regarding Nature and the Universe	
202001089	2020	Tari Rapa'i Bubee	Performing Arts	
202101240	2021	Kupiah Meukeutob	Traditional Crafts Skills and Proficiency	
202201529	2022	Canang Ceureukeuh	Traditional Crafts Skills and Proficiency	
202201530	2022	Pisang Sale Lhok Nibong	Traditional Crafts Skills and Proficiency	
202201531	2022	Sie Reuboh	Traditional Crafts Skills and Proficiency	
202201532	2022	Apam Aceh	Traditional Crafts Skills and Proficiency	
202201533	2022	Terasi Langsa	Traditional Crafts Skills and Proficiency	
202201534	2022	Dendang Lebah	Traditions and Oral Expressions	
202201535	2022	Dikee Pam Panga	Performing Arts	
202201536	2022	Ie Bu Peudah	Traditional Crafts Skills and Proficiency	
202201537	2022	Kasab	Traditional Crafts Skills and Proficiency	
202201538	2022	Rumah Rungko	Traditional Crafts Skills and Proficiency	
202201539	2022	Meudayang	Knowledge and Habits of Behavior Regarding Nature and the Universe	
202201540	2022	Smong (Nafi-Nafi)	Knowledge and Habits of Behavior Regarding Nature and the Universe	
202201541	2022	Ambek-ambeken	Performing Arts	
202201542	2022	Melengkan	Traditions and Oral Expressions	
202201543	2022	Sidalupa	Performing Arts	
202201544	2022	Tangis Dilo	Traditions and Oral Expressions	
202201545	2022	Malamang Aceh	Traditional Crafts Skills and Proficiency	
202301871	2023	Semeuleung Raja	Community Customs, Rites, and Celebrations	
202301872	2023	Gegedem	Traditional Crafts Skills and Proficiency	
202301873	2023	Keujreun Blang	Community Customs, Rites, and Celebrations	
202301874	2023	Rateb Beujalan	Community Customs, Rites, and Celebrations	
202301875	2023	Madeung	Knowledge and Habits of Behavior Regarding Nature and the Universe	
202301876	2023	Munirin Reje	Community Customs, Rites, and Celebrations	
202301877	2023	Khanduri Uten	Community Customs, Rites, and Celebrations	
202301878	2023	Geudeu-Geudeu	Performing Arts	
202301879	2023	Langsir Haloban	Performing Arts	
202301880	2023	Bahasa Devayan	Traditions and Oral Expressions	
202301881	2023	Hiem	Traditions and Oral Expressions	
	2024	Pok Teupeun	Traditional Crafts Skills and Proficiency	
	2024	Seumapa	Traditions and Oral Expressions	
	2024	Bahasa Aceh	Traditions and Oral Expressions	
	2024	Bahasa Gayo	Traditions and Oral Expressions	
	2024	Do Da Idi	Traditions and Oral Expressions	
	2024	Timphan	Traditional Crafts Skills and Proficiency	
	2024	Malam Boh Gaca	Community Customs, Rites, and Celebrations	
	2024	Pepongoten	Traditions and Oral Expressions	
	2024	Teganing	Traditional Crafts Skills and Proficiency	

=== North Sumatra ===
Number of registration	Year	Cultural works	Domain	Image
201300002	2013	Tor-Tor	Performing Arts	
201300003	2013	Gordang Sambilan	Performing Arts	
201300004	2013	Rumah Adat Karo	Traditional Crafts Skills and Proficiency	
201400083	2014	Huda-huda	Performing Arts	
201400084	2014	Omo Hada	Traditional Crafts Skills and Proficiency	
201400085	2014	Bola Nafo	Traditional Crafts Skills and Proficiency	
201400086	2014	Serampang Duabelas	Performing Arts	
201400087	2014	Berahoi	Traditions and Oral Expressions	
201400088	2014	Merdang-Merdem	Community Customs, Rites, and Celebrations	
201400089	2014	Ulos Batak Toba	Performing Arts	
201500179	2015	Pustaha Lak-Lak	Traditions and Oral Expressions	
201600303	2016	Erpangir Ku Lau	Community Customs, Rites, and Celebrations	
201600304	2016	Sipaha Lima (Ugamo Malim)	Community Customs, Rites, and Celebrations	
201600305	2016	Ni 'Oworu	Traditional Crafts Skills and Proficiency	
201600306	2016	Dayok Binatur	Traditional Crafts Skills and Proficiency	
201700450	2017	Genderang Sisibah	Performing Arts	
201700451	2017	Holat	Traditional Crafts Skills and Proficiency	
201700452	2017	Toge Panyabungan	Traditional Crafts Skills and Proficiency	
201700453	2017	Tari Gubang	Performing Arts	
201700454	2017	Babae	Traditional Crafts Skills and Proficiency	
201800602	2018	Tari Dulang	Performing Arts	
201800603	2018	Sinandong Asahan	Performing Arts	
201800604	2018	Guro-Guro Aron	Performing Arts	
201800605	2018	Pelleng	Traditional Crafts Skills and Proficiency	
201800606	2018	Gotong	Traditional Crafts Skills and Proficiency	
201800607	2018	Itak Poul Poul	Traditional Crafts Skills and Proficiency	
201800608	2018	Kala Bubu	Traditional Crafts Skills and Proficiency	
201800609	2018	Mangarontas	Knowledge and Habits of Behavior Regarding Nature and the Universe	
201900824	2019	Tortor Sombah	Performing Arts	

=== West Sumatra ===
Number of registration	Year	Cultural works	Domain	Image
201300005	2013	Randang	Traditional Crafts Skills and Proficiency	
201300006	2013	Rumah Gadang	Traditional Crafts Skills and Proficiency	
201300007	2013	Sistem Garis Keturunan Ibu di Masyarakat Minangkabau	Knowledge and Habits of Behavior Regarding Nature and the Universe	
201400090	2014	Kaba Cindua Mato	Traditions and Oral Expressions	
201400091	2014	Tari Toga	Performing Arts	
201400092	2014	Songket Pandai Sikek	Traditional Crafts Skills and Proficiency	
201400093	2014	Rongeng Pasaman	Performing Arts	
201400094	2014	Indang Piaman	Performing Arts	
201400095	2014	Tato Mentawai	Knowledge and Habits of Behavior Regarding Nature and the Universe	
201400096	2014	Silek Minang	Performing Arts	
201500201	2015	Ulu Ambek	Performing Arts	
201500202	2015	Rabab	Performing Arts	
201500203	2015	Salawat Dulang	Traditions and Oral Expressions	
201500204	2015	Pasambahan	Community Customs, Rites, and Celebrations	
201500205	2015	Batombe	Performing Arts	
201600328	2016	Tari Tanduak (Tari Tanduk)	Performing Arts	
201600329	2016	Tari Piriang (Tari Piring)	Performing Arts	
201700455	2017	Randai	Traditions and Oral Expressions	
201800610	2018	Bahasa Tansi Sawahlunto	Traditions and Oral Expressions	
201900825	2019	Babiola	Performing Arts	
201900826	2019	Talempong Unggan	Performing Arts	
201900827	2019	Tari Benten	Performing Arts	
201900828	2019	Sikerei	Community Customs, Rites, and Celebrations	
201900829	2019	Botatah	Community Customs, Rites, and Celebrations	
201900830	2019	Arak Bako	Community Customs, Rites, and Celebrations	
201900831	2019	Songket Silungkang	Traditional Crafts Skills and Proficiency	
201900832	2019	Sikambang Manih	Performing Arts	
201900833	2019	Tari Kain	Performing Arts	
201900834	2019	Anak Balam	Community Customs, Rites, and Celebrations	
201900835	2019	Diki Pano	Traditions and Oral Expressions	
201900836	2019	Patang Balimau	Community Customs, Rites, and Celebrations	
201900837	2019	Badampiang	Traditions and Oral Expressions	

=== Bengkulu ===
Number of registration	Year	Cultural works	Domain	Image
201500208	2015	Kain Besurek	Traditional Crafts Skills and Proficiency	
201500209	2015	Kain Lantung	Traditional Crafts Skills and Proficiency	
201500210	2015	Uemak Potong Jang	Traditional Crafts Skills and Proficiency	
201700456	2017	Bekejai	Community Customs, Rites, and Celebrations	
201700457	2017	Tari Kejai	Performing Arts	
201800611	2018	Tari Gandai	Performing Arts	
201800612	2018	Guritan Kaur Bengkulu	Traditions and Oral Expressions	
201900874	2019	Ringit	Traditions and Oral Expressions	
201900875	2019	Serunai Bengkulu	Traditional Crafts Skills and Proficiency	
201900876	2019	Tadutan Bengkulu	Traditions and Oral Expressions	
201900877	2019	Masak Lemang	Traditions and Oral Expressions	

=== Riau ===
Number registration	Year	Cultural works	Domain	Image
201300013	2013	Tenun Siak	Traditional Crafts Skills and Proficiency	
201500183	2015	Koba	Performing Arts	
201500184	2015	Pacu Jalur	Traditions and Oral Expressions	
201500185	2015	Menumbai Pelalawan	Knowledge and Habits of Behavior Regarding Nature and the Universe	
201600309	2016	Randai Kuantan	Performing Arts	
201600310	2016	Nyanyi Panjang	Traditions and Oral Expressions	
201600311	2016	Bedewo Bonai	Knowledge and Habits of Behavior Regarding Nature and the Universe	
201600312	2016	Debus Indragiri Hulu	Performing Arts	
201600313	2016	Calempong Oguong	Performing Arts	
201600314	2016	Joget Sonde	Performing Arts	
201700473	2017	Tunjuk Ajar Melayu	Traditions and Oral Expressions	
201700474	2017	Sijobang	Performing Arts	
201700475	2017	Silat Perisai	Performing Arts	
201700476	2017	Zapin Api	Performing Arts	
201700477	2017	Zapin Meskom	Performing Arts	
201700478	2017	Manongkah	Knowledge and Habits of Behavior Regarding Nature and the Universe	
201700479	2017	Perahu Beganduang	Community Customs, Rites, and Celebrations	
201700480	2017	Batobo	Traditions and Oral Expressions	
201700481	2017	Rumah Lontiok	Traditional Crafts Skills and Proficiency	
201700482	2017	Selembayung Riau	Traditional Crafts Skills and Proficiency	
201700483	2017	Onduo Rokan	Performing Arts	
201800633	2018	Silek Tigo Bulan	Performing Arts	
201800634	2018	Syair Siak Sri Indrapura	Traditions and Oral Expressions	
201800635	2018	Ratik Bosa/Ratik Tagak	Community Customs, Rites, and Celebrations	
201800636	2018	Ghatib Beghanyut	Community Customs, Rites, and Celebrations	
201800637	2018	Lukah Gilo Riau	Community Customs, Rites, and Celebrations	
201800638	2018	Basiacuong	Traditions and Oral Expressions	
201800639	2018	Belian Riau	Community Customs, Rites, and Celebrations	
201800640	2018	Silat Pangean	Performing Arts	
201800641	2018	Kotik Adat Kampar	Community Customs, Rites, and Celebrations	
201800642	2018	Badondong	Traditions and Oral Expressions	
201800643	2018	Nandung Indragiri Hulu	Traditions and Oral Expressions	
201800644	2018	Kayat Kuansing/Kayat Rantau Kuantan	Traditions and Oral Expressions	
201800645	2018	Pantun Atui	Traditions and Oral Expressions	
201800646	2018	Tari Gendong	Performing Arts	
201900838	2019	Burung Kwayang	Performing Arts	
201900839	2019	Tari Cegak	Performing Arts	
201900840	2019	Zapin Siak Sri Inderapura	Performing Arts	
201900841	2019	Syair Surat Kapal	Traditions and Oral Expressions	
201900842	2019	Tepuk Tepung Tawar Riau	Community Customs, Rites, and Celebrations	
201900843	2019	Dikei Sakai	Community Customs, Rites, and Celebrations	

=== Riau Islands ===
Number of registration	Year	Cultural works	Domain	Image
201300014	2013	Makyong	Performing Arts	
201300015	2013	Gurindam Dua Belas	Traditions and Oral Expressions	
201300016	2013	Gazal	Traditions and Oral Expressions	
201400111	2014	Pantun Melayu	Traditions and Oral Expressions	
201400112	2014	Gendang Siantan	Performing Arts	
201400113	2014	Gubang	Performing Arts	
201500180	2015	Teater Bangsawan	Performing Arts	
201500181	2015	Joget Dangkong	Performing Arts	
201500182	2015	Tudung Manto	Traditional Crafts Skills and Proficiency	
201600307	2016	Gasing Kepri	Traditional Crafts Skills and Proficiency	
201600308	2016	Langlang Buana	Traditions and Oral Expressions	
201700484	2017	Bejenjang	Knowledge and Habits of Behavior Regarding Nature and the Universe	
201700485	2017	Tari Inai	Performing Arts	
201800647	2018	Tepuk Tepung Tawar Kepulauan Riau	Community Customs, Rites, and Celebrations	
201800648	2018	Bubur Lambok Lingga	Traditional Crafts Skills and Proficiency	
201800649	2018	Mandi Syafar Kepulauan Riau	Community Customs, Rites, and Celebrations	
201800650	2018	Ratib Saman Lingga	Community Customs, Rites, and Celebrations	
201800651	2018	Silat Pengantin Kepulauan Riau	Performing Arts	
201800652	2018	Syariful Anam Karimun	Community Customs, Rites, and Celebrations	
201900844	2019	Tradisi Basuh Lantai	Community Customs, Rites, and Celebrations	
201900845	2019	Tujuh Likur dan Pintu Gerbang Lingga	Community Customs, Rites, and Celebrations	
201900846	2019	Berkhatam Al-Qur'an Lingga	Community Customs, Rites, and Celebrations	
201900847	2019	Sunat Mudim	Community Customs, Rites, and Celebrations	
201900848	2019	Bersih Tembuni Lingga	Community Customs, Rites, and Celebrations	
201900849	2019	Bela Kampong	Community Customs, Rites, and Celebrations	
201900850	2019	Kue Mueh Pengantin Lingga	Traditional Crafts Skills and Proficiency	
201900851	2019	Kepurun Lingga	Traditional Crafts Skills and Proficiency	
201900852	2019	Tudung Saji Pandan Lingga	Traditional Crafts Skills and Proficiency	
201900853	2019	Permainan Ambong Gile	Traditions and Oral Expressions	
201900854	2019	Gasing Lingga	Traditions and Oral Expressions	
201900855	2019	Permainan Tangkap Ayam	Traditions and Oral Expressions	
201900856	2019	Tam-Tam Buku Lingga	Traditions and Oral Expressions	
201900857	2019	Layang-Layang Lingga	Traditional Crafts Skills and Proficiency	
201900858	2019	Kain Lipat 44	Traditional Crafts Skills and Proficiency	
201900859	2019	Tuturan Asal Mula Nama Kampung Nerekeh	Traditions and Oral Expressions	

=== Jambi ===
Number of registration	Year	Cultural works	Domain	Image
201300012	2013	Krinok	Performing Arts	
201400103	2014	Aksara Kaganga (Aksara Incung)	Traditions and Oral Expressions	
201400104	2014	Seloko Melayu Jambi	Traditions and Oral Expressions	
201400105	2014	Senandung Jolo	Traditions and Oral Expressions	
201500193	2015	Kompangan	Performing Arts	
201500194	2015	Kuaw	Traditions and Oral Expressions	
201500195	2015	Tari Anggut	Performing Arts	
201500196	2015	Tari Besayak	Performing Arts	
201500197	2015	Tari Piring Tujuh	Performing Arts	
201500198	2015	Tari Pisang	Performing Arts	
201500199	2015	Tupai Jenjang	Performing Arts	
201500200	2015	Upacara Besale	Community Customs, Rites, and Celebrations	
201600322	2016	Tale Nek Jei (Tale Keberangkatan Haji)	Traditions and Oral Expressions	
201600323	2016	Upacara Asyeik	Knowledge and Habits of Behavior Regarding Nature and the Universe	
201600324	2016	Tauh (Betauh)	Community Customs, Rites, and Celebrations	
201600325	2016	Tari Kain Kromong	Performing Arts	
201600326	2016	Musik Kromong Mandiangin	Performing Arts	
201600327	2016	Musik Kalinong	Performing Arts	
201700461	2017	Tari Elang	Performing Arts	
201700462	2017	Tomboi Sialong/Tomboi Ngambek Rapa	Knowledge and Habits of Behavior Regarding Nature and the Universe	
201700463	2017	Sebelik Sumpah	Traditional Crafts Skills and Proficiency	
201700464	2017	Ambung Orang Rimbo	Traditional Crafts Skills and Proficiency	
201700465	2017	Cawot	Traditional Crafts Skills and Proficiency	
201700466	2017	Ubat Ramuon Orang Rimbo	Knowledge and Habits of Behavior Regarding Nature and the Universe	
201700467	2017	Belangun Orang Rimbo	Community Customs, Rites, and Celebrations	
201700468	2017	Hompongon	Knowledge and Habits of Behavior Regarding Nature and the Universe	
201700469	2017	Musik Gambang Dano Lamo	Performing Arts	
201700470	2017	Tari Kadam	Performing Arts	
201800620	2018	Rangguk Kumun	Performing Arts	
201800621	2018	Lapaek Koto Dian Rawang	Traditional Crafts Skills and Proficiency	
201800622	2018	Kenduri Sko	Community Customs, Rites, and Celebrations	
201800623	2018	Tauh Lempur	Performing Arts	
201800624	2018	Ntak Awo	Performing Arts	
201800625	2018	Ampek Gonjie Limo Gonop	Traditions and Oral Expressions	
201800626	2018	Perkampungan Tradisional Rumah Tuo Rantau Panjang	Knowledge and Habits of Behavior Regarding Nature and the Universe	
201800627	2018	Tari Iyo-Iyo	Performing Arts	
201800628	2018	Ngagoah Imo Pulau Tengah	Performing Arts	
201900860	2019	Betauh Perentak	Community Customs, Rites, and Celebrations	
201900861	2019	Sungku	Traditional Crafts Skills and Proficiency	
201900862	2019	Tkud	Knowledge and Habits of Behavior Regarding Nature and the Universe	
201900863	2019	Lubuk Larangan	Knowledge and Habits of Behavior Regarding Nature and the Universe	
201900864	2019	Dideng	Traditions and Oral Expressions	
201900865	2019	Malam Tari Inai	Community Customs, Rites, and Celebrations	
201900866	2019	Nek Pung	Performing Arts	
201900867	2019	Tapa Menggala	Traditions and Oral Expressions	
201900868	2019	Dzikir Berdah Muaro Jambi	Performing Arts	
201900869	2019	Tari Ayam Biring	Performing Arts	

=== South Sumatra ===
Number of registration	Year	Cultural works	Domain	Image
201300008	2013	Dulmuluk	Performing Arts	
201300009	2013	Songket Palembang	Traditional Crafts Skills and Proficiency	
201400097	2014	Tari Gending Sriwijaya	Performing Arts	
201400098	2014	Tembang Batanghari Sembilan	Performing Arts	
201400099	2014	Pempek	Traditional Crafts Skills and Proficiency	
201400100	2014	Guritan Besemah	Performing Arts	
201400101	2014	Rumah Ulu	Traditional Crafts Skills and Proficiency	
201400102	2014	Limas Palembang	Traditional Crafts Skills and Proficiency	centr
201500206	2015	Kue Lapan Jam	Traditional Crafts Skills and Proficiency	
201500207	2015	Senjang	Traditions and Oral Expressions	
201600330	2016	Ande-Ande	Traditions and Oral Expressions	
201600331	2016	Rejung Sumatera Selatan	Traditions and Oral Expressions	
201600332	2016	Warahan Sumatera Selatan	Traditions and Oral Expressions	
201600333	2016	Bidar	Community Customs, Rites, and Celebrations	
201700458	2017	Rumah Besemah	Traditional Crafts Skills and Proficiency	
201700459	2017	Lak	Traditional Crafts Skills and Proficiency	
201700460	2017	Tari Penguton	Performing Arts	
201800613	2018	Adat Timbang Kepala Kebo	Community Customs, Rites, and Celebrations	
201800614	2018	Ngobeng	Community Customs, Rites, and Celebrations	
201800615	2018	Tari Kebagh	Performing Arts	
201800616	2018	Tari Silampari Kahyangan Tinggi	Performing Arts	
201800617	2018	Pindang Palembang	Traditional Crafts Skills and Proficiency	
201800618	2018	Tikar Purun Pedamaran	Traditional Crafts Skills and Proficiency	
201800619	2018	Surat Ulu	Traditions and Oral Expressions	
201900878	2019	Midang	Community Customs, Rites, and Celebrations	
201900879	2019	Tanjak Palembang	Traditional Crafts Skills and Proficiency	
201900880	2019	Cak Ingkling	Performing Arts	
201900881	2019	Kelentangan Banyuasin	Performing Arts	
201900882	2019	Tempoyak Palembang	Traditional Crafts Skills and Proficiency	
201900883	2019	Benteng-Bentengan Musi Rawas	Traditions and Oral Expressions	
201900884	2019	Tam-Tam Duku Musi Rawas	Traditions and Oral Expressions	
201900885	2019	Tari Sambut Muara Enim	Performing Arts	

=== Lampung ===
Number of registration	Year	Cultural works	Domain	Image
201300019	2013	Tapis	Traditional Crafts Skills and Proficiency	
201400114	2014	Lamban Pesagi	Traditional Crafts Skills and Proficiency	
201400115	2014	Tari Melinting	Performing Arts	
201400116	2014	Gamolan Pekhing	Performing Arts	
201400117	2014	Muayak	Traditions and Oral Expressions	
201400118	2014	Sigeh Penguten	Performing Arts	
201500211	2015	Gulai Taboh	Traditional Crafts Skills and Proficiency	
201500212	2015	Sekura Cakak Buah	Community Customs, Rites, and Celebrations	
201500213	2015	Sulam Usus	Traditional Crafts Skills and Proficiency	
201500214	2015	Seruit	Traditional Crafts Skills and Proficiency	
201500215	2015	Cakak Pepadun	Community Customs, Rites, and Celebrations	
201600334	2016	Warahan Lampung	Traditions and Oral Expressions	
201600335	2016	Kakiceran	Community Customs, Rites, and Celebrations	
201600336	2016	Maduaro	Traditional Crafts Skills and Proficiency	
201600337	2016	Tenun Ikat Inuh	Traditional Crafts Skills and Proficiency	
201600338	2016	Tuping	Traditional Crafts Skills and Proficiency	
201700486	2017	Nyambai	Community Customs, Rites, and Celebrations	
201700487	2017	Bediom	Community Customs, Rites, and Celebrations	
201700488	2017	Tari Bedayou Tulang Bawang	Performing Arts	
201800653	2018	Dadi	Traditions and Oral Expressions	
201800654	2018	Siger Lampung	Community Customs, Rites, and Celebrations	
201800655	2018	Ketaro Adat Lappung	Traditions and Oral Expressions	
201800656	2018	Nyuncun Pahakh	Knowledge and Habits of Behavior Regarding Nature and the Universe	
201800657	2018	Tari Bedana Lampung	Performing Arts	
201800658	2018	Sebambangan	Community Customs, Rites, and Celebrations	
201800659	2018	Nyubuk Majeu	Community Customs, Rites, and Celebrations	
201800660	2018	Cangget Agung Lampung	Community Customs, Rites, and Celebrations	
201800661	2018	Kias	Traditions and Oral Expressions	
201800662	2018	Tari Kiamat	Performing Arts	
201800663	2018	Piil Pesinggiri	Knowledge and Habits of Behavior Regarding Nature and the Universe	
201800664	2018	Badik Lampung	Knowledge and Habits of Behavior Regarding Nature and the Universe	
201800665	2018	Mekhatin	Community Customs, Rites, and Celebrations	
201900886	2019	Muwaghei	Community Customs, Rites, and Celebrations	
201900887	2019	Hadra Ugan	Performing Arts	
201900888	2019	Ngunduh Damakh	Knowledge and Habits of Behavior Regarding Nature and the Universe	
201900889	2019	Ngejalang	Traditions and Oral Expressions	
201900890	2019	Tari Dibingi	Performing Arts	
201900891	2019	Tari Ittar Muli	Performing Arts	
201900892	2019	Ringget	Traditions and Oral Expressions	
201900893	2019	Panggeh	Traditions and Oral Expressions	
201900894	2019	Mukew Sahur	Traditions and Oral Expressions	
201900895	2019	Ngakuk Maju	Community Customs, Rites, and Celebrations	
201900896	2019	Adok	Community Customs, Rites, and Celebrations	
201900897	2019	Blangiran	Community Customs, Rites, and Celebrations	
201900898	2019	Bedikekh	Traditions and Oral Expressions	
201900899	2019	Hahiwang	Traditions and Oral Expressions	
201900900	2019	Pincak Khakot	Traditions and Oral Expressions	
201900901	2019	Pengangkonan Anak	Community Customs, Rites, and Celebrations	
201900902	2019	Tari Selapanan	Performing Arts	

=== Bangka Belitung Islands ===
Number registration	Year	Cultural works	Domain	Image
201300017	2013	Dambus	Performing Arts	
201300018	2013	Muang Jong	Community Customs, Rites, and Celebrations	
201400106	2014	Adat Nganggung	Community Customs, Rites, and Celebrations	
201400107	2014	Campak Dalung	Traditions and Oral Expressions	
201400108	2014	Adat Taber Kampung	Community Customs, Rites, and Celebrations	
201400109	2014	Perang Ketupat	Community Customs, Rites, and Celebrations	
201400110	2014	Tari Kedidi	Performing Arts	
201500186	2015	Adu Kerito Surong	Traditions and Oral Expressions	
201500187	2015	Kain Cual	Traditional Crafts Skills and Proficiency	
201500188	2015	Upacara Adat Nujuh Jerami	Community Customs, Rites, and Celebrations	
201500189	2015	Maras Taun	Community Customs, Rites, and Celebrations	
201500190	2015	Kopiah Resam	Traditional Crafts Skills and Proficiency	
201500191	2015	Lempah Kuning	Traditional Crafts Skills and Proficiency	
201500192	2015	Tradisi Ruwah Kubur	Community Customs, Rites, and Celebrations	
201600315	2016	Telo' Seroja	Community Customs, Rites, and Celebrations	
201600316	2016	Besaoh Dalam Beume	Knowledge and Habits of Behavior Regarding Nature and the Universe	
201600317	2016	Memarung, Panggung	Knowledge and Habits of Behavior Regarding Nature and the Universe	
201600318	2016	Tari Gajah Menunggang	Performing Arts	
201600319	2016	Sepen Penyok	Performing Arts	
201600320	2016	Rudat Bangka Belitung	Performing Arts	
201600321	2016	Pakaian Pengantin Paksian	Traditional Crafts Skills and Proficiency	
201700471	2017	Gangan	Traditional Crafts Skills and Proficiency	
201700472	2017	Antu Bubu	Traditions and Oral Expressions	
201800629	2018	Serimbang	Performing Arts	
201800630	2018	Hadrah Gendang Empat Belitong	Performing Arts	
201800631	2018	Emping Beras	Traditional Crafts Skills and Proficiency	
201800632	2018	Sepen Buding	Performing Arts	
201900870	2019	Gangan Buntal Darat	Traditional Crafts Skills and Proficiency	
201900871	2019	Lesong Ketintong	Community Customs, Rites, and Celebrations	
201900872	2019	Nirok Nangok	Traditions and Oral Expressions	
201900873	2019	Pentiaw Ubi	Traditional Crafts Skills and Proficiency	

=== Jakarta ===
Number of registration	Year	Cultural works	Domain	Image
201300021	2013	Ondel-ondel	Performing Arts	
201300022	2013	Topeng Betawi dan Lenong	Performing Arts	
201400121	2014	Upacara Babarit	Community Customs, Rites, and Celebrations	
201400122	2014	Nasi Uduk	Traditional Crafts Skills and Proficiency	
201400123	2014	Sayur Besan	Traditional Crafts Skills and Proficiency	
201400124	2014	Kerak Telor	Traditional Crafts Skills and Proficiency	
201400125	2014	Gabus Pucung	Traditional Crafts Skills and Proficiency	
201400126	2014	Roti Buaya	Traditional Crafts Skills and Proficiency	
201400127	2014	Bir Pletok	Traditional Crafts Skills and Proficiency	
201400128	2014	Blenggo	Performing Arts	
201500221	2015	Tanjidor	Performing Arts	
201500222	2015	Palang Pintu	Community Customs, Rites, and Celebrations	
201500223	2015	Sohibul Hikayat	Traditions and Oral Expressions	
201500224	2015	Gambang Kromong	Performing Arts	
201500225	2015	Silat Beksi	Traditions and Oral Expressions	
201600341	2016	Samrah Betawi	Performing Arts	
201600342	2016	Gambang Rancag	Performing Arts	
201600343	2016	Topeng Jantuk	Performing Arts	
201600344	2016	Keroncong Tugu	Performing Arts	
201600345	2016	Topeng Blantek	Performing Arts	
201600346	2016	Soto Betawi	Traditional Crafts Skills and Proficiency	
201600347	2016	Gado-gado Betawi	Traditional Crafts Skills and Proficiency	
201600348	2016	Rias Besar	Traditional Crafts Skills and Proficiency	
201700494	2017	Kebaya Kerancang	Traditional Crafts Skills and Proficiency	
201700495	2017	Batik Betawi	Traditional Crafts Skills and Proficiency	
201700496	2017	Topeng Tunggal	Traditions and Oral Expressions	
201700497	2017	Penganten Sunat	Community Customs, Rites, and Celebrations	
201700498	2017	Rebana Biang	Performing Arts	
201700499	2017	Hadroh Betawi	Traditions and Oral Expressions	
201700500	2017	Dodol Betawi	Traditional Crafts Skills and Proficiency	
201700501	2017	Silat Cingkrik	Performing Arts	
201800669	2018	Bahasa Betawi	Traditions and Oral Expressions	
201800670	2018	Caca Gulali	Traditions and Oral Expressions	
201800671	2018	Cici Putri	Traditions and Oral Expressions	
201800672	2018	Kembang Kelape	Traditional Crafts Skills and Proficiency	
201800673	2018	Uncul	Performing Arts	
201800674	2018	Nasi Ulam Betawi	Traditional Crafts Skills and Proficiency	
201800675	2018	Silat Tiga Berantai	Traditions and Oral Expressions	
201800676	2018	Zapin Betawi	Performing Arts	
201800677	2018	Wayang Kulit Betawi	Performing Arts	
201900903	2019	Arsitektur Rumah Betawi	Traditional Crafts Skills and Proficiency	
201900904	2019	Silat Mustika Kwitang	Traditions and Oral Expressions	
201900905	2019	Silat Pusaka Djakarta	Traditions and Oral Expressions	
201900906	2019	Silat Troktok	Traditions and Oral Expressions	
201900907	2019	Rabo-Rabo	Community Customs, Rites, and Celebrations	
201900908	2019	Mandi-Mandi	Community Customs, Rites, and Celebrations	
201900909	2019	Sate Lembut	Traditional Crafts Skills and Proficiency	
201900910	2019	Pindang Bandeng Betawi	Traditional Crafts Skills and Proficiency	
201900911	2019	Ketupat Sayur Babanci	Traditional Crafts Skills and Proficiency	
201900912	2019	Bubur Ase	Traditional Crafts Skills and Proficiency	
201900913	2019	Laksa Betawi	Traditional Crafts Skills and Proficiency	
201900914	2019	Kue Akar Kelape	Traditional Crafts Skills and Proficiency	
201900915	2019	Kue Sengkulun	Traditional Crafts Skills and Proficiency	
201900916	2019	Selendang Mayang	Traditional Crafts Skills and Proficiency	
201900917	2019	Wak-Wak Gung	Traditions and Oral Expressions	
201900918	2019	Galasin Betawi	Traditions and Oral Expressions	
201900919	2019	Petak Umpet Betawi	Traditions and Oral Expressions	
201900920	2019	Bentengan Betawi	Traditions and Oral Expressions	
201900921	2019	Nujuh Bulanin Betawi	Community Customs, Rites, and Celebrations	
201900922	2019	Ketupat Lepas Betawi	Community Customs, Rites, and Celebrations	
201900923	2019	Dukun Beranak Betawi	Knowledge and Habits of Behavior Regarding Nature and the Universe	
201900924	2019	Congklak Betawi	Traditions and Oral Expressions	
201900925	2019	Silat Sabeni Tenabang	Traditions and Oral Expressions	

=== West Java ===
Number of registration	Year	Cultural works	Domain	Image
201300024	2013	Kujang	Traditional Crafts Skills and Proficiency	
201300025	2013	Ronggeng Gunung	Performing Arts	
201300026	2013	Sisingaan	Performing Arts	
201300073	2013	Angklung	Performing Arts	
201400129	2014	Tari Topeng Cirebon	Performing Arts	
201400130	2014	Kuda Renggong	Performing Arts	
201400131	2014	Jaipong	Performing Arts	
201400167	2014	Kertas Daluang	Traditional Crafts Skills and Proficiency	
201500226	2015	Sintren	Performing Arts	
201500227	2015	Upacara Ngarot	Community Customs, Rites, and Celebrations	
201500228	2015	Mamaos Cianjuran	Performing Arts	
201600349	2016	Mapag Tamba (Nibaaken Tamba)	Community Customs, Rites, and Celebrations	
201600350	2016	Ngalungsur Geni (Ngalungsur Pusaka)	Traditions and Oral Expressions	
201600351	2016	Rahengan	Community Customs, Rites, and Celebrations	
201600352	2016	Pencak Silat Jawa Barat	Performing Arts	
201600353	2016	Badeng	Performing Arts	
201600354	2016	Lais Garut	Performing Arts	
201600355	2016	Kelom Geulis	Traditional Crafts Skills and Proficiency	
201600356	2016	Lukis kaca Cirebon	Traditional Crafts Skills and Proficiency	
201700502	2017	Gembyung	Performing Arts	
201700503	2017	Iket Sunda	Traditional Crafts Skills and Proficiency	
201700504	2017	Kolecer Jawa Barat	Traditional Crafts Skills and Proficiency	
201700505	2017	Leuit	Traditional Crafts Skills and Proficiency	
201700506	2017	Nyangku	Community Customs, Rites, and Celebrations	
201800678	2018	Angklung Buncis	Performing Arts	
201800679	2018	Badud	Performing Arts	
201800680	2018	Bebegig	Performing Arts	
201800681	2018	Gaok	Performing Arts	
201800682	2018	Gondang Buhun	Community Customs, Rites, and Celebrations	
201800683	2018	Hajat Laut	Community Customs, Rites, and Celebrations	
201800684	2018	Kuda Kosong	Community Customs, Rites, and Celebrations	
201800685	2018	Ngabungbang Batulawang	Community Customs, Rites, and Celebrations	
201800686	2018	Ngalaksa	Community Customs, Rites, and Celebrations	
201800687	2018	Reog Dongkol	Performing Arts	
201800688	2018	Sate Maranggi	Traditional Crafts Skills and Proficiency	
201800689	2018	Tarawangsa	Community Customs, Rites, and Celebrations	
201800690	2018	Tari Kedempling	Performing Arts	
201800691	2018	Tari Umbul	Performing Arts	
201800692	2018	Tarling	Performing Arts	
201800693	2018	Uyeg	Performing Arts	
201900926	2019	Badawang	Performing Arts	
201900927	2019	Bajidoran	Performing Arts	
201900928	2019	Belenderan	Performing Arts	
201900929	2019	Benjang	Traditions and Oral Expressions	
201900930	2019	Cingcowong	Community Customs, Rites, and Celebrations	
201900931	2019	Domyak	Performing Arts	
201900932	2019	Kawin Cai	Community Customs, Rites, and Celebrations	
201900933	2019	Panjang Jimat Kasepuhan Cirebon	Community Customs, Rites, and Celebrations	
201900934	2019	Reak Dogdog	Performing Arts	
201900935	2019	Seren Taun Cigugur	Community Customs, Rites, and Celebrations	
201900936	2019	Seren Taun Kasepuhan Banten Kidul, Kabupaten Sukabumi	Community Customs, Rites, and Celebrations	
201900937	2019	Tari Randu Kentir	Performing Arts	
201900938	2019	Topeng Banjet	Performing Arts	

=== Banten ===
Number of registration	Year	Cultural works	Domain
201300020	2013	Debus Banten	Performing Arts
201400119	2014	Pencak Silat Bandrong	Performing Arts
201400120	2014	Ubrug	Performing Arts
201500216	2015	Tari Cokek	Performing Arts
201500217	2015	Angklung Buhun	Performing Arts
201500218	2015	Seni Rampak Bedug	Performing Arts
201500219	2015	Sate Bandeng	Traditional Crafts Skills and Proficiency
201500220	2015	Seba Baduy	Community Customs, Rites, and Celebrations
201600339	2016	Seren Taun Banten Kidul	Community Customs, Rites, and Celebrations
201600340	2016	Angeun Lada	Traditional Crafts Skills and Proficiency
201700489	2017	Golok Sulangkar	Traditional Crafts Skills and Proficiency
201700490	2017	Golok Ciomas	Traditional Crafts Skills and Proficiency
201700491	2017	Zikir Saman Banten	Traditions and Oral Expressions
201700492	2017	Patingtung	Performing Arts
201700493	2017	Wayang Garing Serang	Performing Arts
201800666	2018	Rudat Banten	Performing Arts
201800667	2018	Koja	Traditional Crafts Skills and Proficiency
201800668	2018	Maca Syekh	Traditions and Oral Expressions

=== Central Java ===
Number of registration	Year	Cultural works	Domain	Image
201300072	2013	Keris	Traditional Crafts Skills and Proficiency	
201400132	2014	Lumpia Semarang	Traditional Crafts Skills and Proficiency	
201500229	2015	Ukir Jepara	Traditional Crafts Skills and Proficiency	
201600357	2016	Jolenan Somongari	Community Customs, Rites, and Celebrations	
201600358	2016	Upacara Adat Apeman Yaqowiyu	Community Customs, Rites, and Celebrations	
201600359	2016	Ruwatan Rambut Gimbal	Community Customs, Rites, and Celebrations	
201600360	2016	Meron Pati	Community Customs, Rites, and Celebrations	
201600361	2016	Turonggo Seto Boyolali	Performing Arts	
201600362	2016	Tari Gambyong	Performing Arts	
201600363	2016	Joglo Pencu	Traditional Crafts Skills and Proficiency	cebntre
201700525	2017	Tempe Jawa Tengah	Traditional Crafts Skills and Proficiency	
201700526	2017	Barongan Blora	Performing Arts	
201700527	2017	Gethuk Goreng Sokaraja	Traditional Crafts Skills and Proficiency	
201800721	2018	Manten Kaji	Community Customs, Rites, and Celebrations	
201800722	2018	Tari Topeng Endel Tegal	Performing Arts	
201800723	2018	Kalang Obong Kendal	Community Customs, Rites, and Celebrations	
201800724	2018	Grebeg Besar Demak	Community Customs, Rites, and Celebrations	
201800725	2018	Hak-Hakan	Community Customs, Rites, and Celebrations	
201800726	2018	Gambang Semarang	Performing Arts	
201800727	2018	Begalan Banyumas	Community Customs, Rites, and Celebrations	
201800728	2018	Kethek Ogleng Wonogiri	Performing Arts	
201800729	2018	Sedulur Sikep Blora	Knowledge and Habits of Behavior Regarding Nature and the Universe	
201900939	2019	Dolalak	Performing Arts	
201900940	2019	Suran Tutup Ngisor Kabupaten Magelang	Community Customs, Rites, and Celebrations	
201900941	2019	Lengger Banyumas	Performing Arts	
201900942	2019	Jaranan Margowati	Performing Arts	
201900943	2019	Sintren Kabupaten Pekalongan	Performing Arts	
201900944	2019	Tari Prajuritan Kabupaten Semarang	Performing Arts	
201900945	2019	Ngasa Kabupaten Brebes	Community Customs, Rites, and Celebrations	
201900946	2019	Jamu Jawa Tengah	Traditional Crafts Skills and Proficiency	
201900947	2019	Dakon Jawa Tengah	Traditions and Oral Expressions	

=== Yogyakarta ===
Number of registration	Year	Cultural works	Domain
201300033	2013	Gerabah Kasongan	Traditional Crafts Skills and Proficiency
201400141	2014	Bedhaya Semang	Performing Arts
201500230	2015	Rumah Joglo Yogyakarta	Traditional Crafts Skills and Proficiency
201500231	2015	Upacara Mubeng Beteng	Community Customs, Rites, and Celebrations
201500232	2015	Gudeg	Traditional Crafts Skills and Proficiency
201500233	2015	Saparan Bekakak	Community Customs, Rites, and Celebrations
201600364	2016	Suran Mbah Demang	Community Customs, Rites, and Celebrations
201600365	2016	Upacara Tawur Kesanga Yogyakarta	Community Customs, Rites, and Celebrations
201600366	2016	Labuhan Keraton Yogyakarta	Community Customs, Rites, and Celebrations
201600367	2016	Langendriya Yogyakarta	Performing Arts
201600368	2016	Tari Angguk	Performing Arts
201600369	2016	Langen Mandra Wanara	Performing Arts
201600370	2016	Jathilan Yogyakarta	Performing Arts
201600371	2016	Lurik Yogyakarta	Traditional Crafts Skills and Proficiency
201600372	2016	Bakpia Yogyakarta	Traditional Crafts Skills and Proficiency
201700507	2017	Beksan Lawung Ageng Keraton Yogyakarta	Performing Arts
201700508	2017	Beksan Bandabaya Pura Pakualaman	Performing Arts
201700509	2017	Badui	Performing Arts
201700510	2017	Khuntulan Yogyakarta	Performing Arts
201700511	2017	Montro	Performing Arts
201700512	2017	Rinding Gumbreng Gunung Kidul	Community Customs, Rites, and Celebrations
201700513	2017	Srandul	Community Customs, Rites, and Celebrations
201700514	2017	Panjidur Yogyakarta	Performing Arts
201700515	2017	Wayang Topeng Pedalangan	Performing Arts
201700516	2017	Bancakan Bayi Yogyakarta	Community Customs, Rites, and Celebrations
201700517	2017	Tata Cara Palakrama Yogyakarta	Community Customs, Rites, and Celebrations
201700518	2017	Beksan Golek Menak	Performing Arts
201700519	2017	Srimpi Rangga Janur	Performing Arts
201700520	2017	Dadung Awuk	Performing Arts
201700521	2017	Blangkon Yogyakarta	Traditional Crafts Skills and Proficiency
201700522	2017	Krumpyung Kulon Progo	Performing Arts
201700523	2017	Wedang Uwuh Imogiri	Traditional Crafts Skills and Proficiency
201700524	2017	Tenun Serat Gamplong	Traditional Crafts Skills and Proficiency
201800694	2018	Wayang Beber Remeng Mangunjoyo	Performing Arts
201800695	2018	Wayang Wong Gaya Yogyakarta	Performing Arts
201800696	2018	Wayang Kancil Yogyakarta	Performing Arts
201800697	2018	Beksan Jebeng	Performing Arts
201800698	2018	Beksan Floret	Performing Arts
201800699	2018	Bedhaya Tejanata Pakualaman	Performing Arts
201800700	2018	Bedhaya Kuwung-Kuwung	Performing Arts
201800701	2018	Beksan Guntur Segara	Performing Arts
201800702	2018	Bedhaya Angron Sekar	Performing Arts
201800703	2018	Beksan Bugis Gaya Yogyakarta	Performing Arts
201800704	2018	Kethek Ogleng Gunung Kidul	Performing Arts
201800705	2018	Gejog Lesung Yogyakarta	Performing Arts
201800706	2018	Macapatan Yogyakarta	Traditions and Oral Expressions
201800707	2018	Benthik Yogyakarta	Traditions and Oral Expressions
201800708	2018	Peksi Moi	Performing Arts
201800709	2018	Saparan Wonolelo	Community Customs, Rites, and Celebrations
201800710	2018	Rebo Pungkasan	Community Customs, Rites, and Celebrations
201800711	2018	Geplak Bantul	Traditional Crafts Skills and Proficiency
201800712	2018	Geblek Kulonprogo	Traditional Crafts Skills and Proficiency
201800713	2018	Dandan Kali	Community Customs, Rites, and Celebrations
201800714	2018	Tayub Yogyakarta	Performing Arts
201800715	2018	Brongkos Yogyakarta	Traditional Crafts Skills and Proficiency
201800716	2018	Beksan Etheng	Performing Arts
201800717	2018	Golek Lambangsari Yogyakarta	Performing Arts
201800718	2018	Batik Nitik Yogyakarta	Traditional Crafts Skills and Proficiency
201800719	2018	Beksan Golek Pucung Kethoprak	Performing Arts
201800720	2018	Nini Thowong Yogyakarta	Performing Arts
201900948	2019	Sate Klathak Jejeran	Traditional Crafts Skills and Proficiency
201900949	2019	Gerobak Sapi Yogyakarta	Traditional Crafts Skills and Proficiency
201900950	2019	Andong Yogyakarta	Traditional Crafts Skills and Proficiency
201900951	2019	Mie Lethek	Traditional Crafts Skills and Proficiency
201900952	2019	Topeng Panji Yogyakarta	Traditional Crafts Skills and Proficiency
201900953	2019	Kerajinan Kulit Tatah Sungging Yogyakarta	Traditional Crafts Skills and Proficiency
201900954	2019	Kipo	Traditional Crafts Skills and Proficiency
201900955	2019	Dawet Camcau Yogyakarta	Traditional Crafts Skills and Proficiency
201900956	2019	Growol	Traditional Crafts Skills and Proficiency
201900957	2019	Dawet Sambal	Traditional Crafts Skills and Proficiency
201900958	2019	Pewarna Alami Yogyakarta	Knowledge and Habits of Behavior Regarding Nature and the Universe
201900959	2019	Sawah Surjan	Knowledge and Habits of Behavior Regarding Nature and the Universe
201900960	2019	Jamasan Pusaka Suroloyo	Community Customs, Rites, and Celebrations
201900961	2019	Cembengan Yogyakarta	Community Customs, Rites, and Celebrations
201900962	2019	Kampung Pitu	Community Customs, Rites, and Celebrations
201900963	2019	Sadranan Logantung Gunungkidul	Community Customs, Rites, and Celebrations
201900964	2019	Sadranan Alas Wonosadi Gunungkidul	Community Customs, Rites, and Celebrations
201900965	2019	Sadranan Gunung Genthong Gunungkidul	Community Customs, Rites, and Celebrations
201900966	2019	Kembul Sewu Dulur Saparan Bendung Khayangan	Community Customs, Rites, and Celebrations
201900967	2019	Nguras Enceh	Community Customs, Rites, and Celebrations
201900968	2019	Upacara Adat Tunggul Wulung	Community Customs, Rites, and Celebrations
201900969	2019	Upacara Buka Cupu Kyai Panjala	Community Customs, Rites, and Celebrations
201900970	2019	Jabar Juwes	Performing Arts
201900971	2019	Lengger Tapeng	Performing Arts
201900972	2019	Dagelan Mataram	Performing Arts
201900973	2019	Srimpi Renggawati	Performing Arts
201900974	2019	Srimpi Teja	Performing Arts
201900975	2019	Oglek	Performing Arts
201900976	2019	Dhakon Yogyakarta	Traditions and Oral Expressions
201900977	2019	Sholawat Maulud Jawi	Traditions and Oral Expressions

=== East Java ===
Number of registration	Year	Cultural works	Domain
201300028	2013	Reog Ponorogo	Performing Arts
201300029	2013	Keraben Sape	Traditions and Oral Expressions
201300030	2013	Sapi Sonok	Performing Arts
201300031	2013	Gandrung Banyuwangi	Performing Arts
201300032	2013	Kentrung	Performing Arts
201400133	2014	Tari Seblang	Performing Arts
201400134	2014	Wayang Topeng Malang	Traditions and Oral Expressions
201400135	2014	Tumpeng Sewu	Community Customs, Rites, and Celebrations
201400136	2014	Syiir Madura	Traditions and Oral Expressions
201400137	2014	Kasada	Community Customs, Rites, and Celebrations
201400138	2014	Ludruk	Performing Arts
201400139	2014	Jaran Bodhag	Performing Arts
201400140	2014	Dongkrek	Performing Arts
201500234	2015	Larung Sembonyo	Community Customs, Rites, and Celebrations
201500235	2015	Singo Ulung	Performing Arts
201500236	2015	Wayang Beber	Performing Arts
201500237	2015	Tanean lanjang	Traditional Crafts Skills and Proficiency
201600373	2016	Entas-Entas Tengger	Community Customs, Rites, and Celebrations
201600374	2016	Keboan-Aliyan Osing	Community Customs, Rites, and Celebrations
201600375	2016	Mecak-Tengger	Community Customs, Rites, and Celebrations
201600376	2016	Jaran Kecak	Performing Arts
201600377	2016	Wayang Krucil Malangan	Performing Arts
201600378	2016	Lodho	Traditional Crafts Skills and Proficiency
201700528	2017	Sandhur Manduro	Performing Arts
201700529	2017	Nyadar	Community Customs, Rites, and Celebrations
201700530	2017	Ceprotan	Community Customs, Rites, and Celebrations
201700531	2017	Jamasan Gong Kyai Pradah	Community Customs, Rites, and Celebrations
201700532	2017	Damar Kurung	Traditional Crafts Skills and Proficiency
201800730	2018	Celurit Madura	Traditional Crafts Skills and Proficiency
201800731	2018	Janger Banyuwangi	Performing Arts
201800732	2018	Manten Kucing Tulungagung	Community Customs, Rites, and Celebrations
201800733	2018	Rawon Nguling Prrobolinggo	Traditional Crafts Skills and Proficiency
201800734	2018	Reog Cemandi Sidoarjo	Performing Arts
201800735	2018	Sandur Bojonegoro dan Tuban	Community Customs, Rites, and Celebrations
201800736	2018	Wayang Thengul	Performing Arts
201800737	2018	Topeng Jatiduwur Jombang	Performing Arts
201900978	2019	Mocoan Lontar Yusup Banyuwangi	Traditions and Oral Expressions
201900979	2019	Jaran Kepang Jawa Timur	Performing Arts
201900980	2019	Bantengan Jawa Timur	Performing Arts
201900981	2019	Reog Bulkiyo	Performing Arts
201900982	2019	Larung Sesaji Pantai Tambakrejo	Community Customs, Rites, and Celebrations
201900983	2019	Ajaran Samin Surosentiko Bojonegoro	Knowledge and Habits of Behavior Regarding Nature and the Universe
201900984	2019	Sanggring Gumeno	Community Customs, Rites, and Celebrations
201900985	2019	Besutan Jombang	Performing Arts
201900986	2019	Riyaya Undhuh-Undhuh Mojowarno	Community Customs, Rites, and Celebrations
201900987	2019	Kedhuk Beji	Community Customs, Rites, and Celebrations
201900988	2019	Kethek Ogleng Pacitan	Performing Arts
201900989	2019	Kiprah Glipang	Performing Arts
201900990	2019	Kerapan Sapi Brujul	Knowledge and Habits of Behavior Regarding Nature and the Universe
201900991	2019	Hodo	Community Customs, Rites, and Celebrations
201900992	2019	Ojhung	Community Customs, Rites, and Celebrations
201900993	2019	Mamaca Situbondo	Traditions and Oral Expressions
201900994	2019	Pengantin Putri Jenggolo	Community Customs, Rites, and Celebrations
201900995	2019	Saronen	Performing Arts
201900996	2019	Jamasan Pusaka Kanjeng Kyai Upas	Community Customs, Rites, and Celebrations
201900997	2019	Gemblak Tuban	Performing Arts

=== West Kalimantan ===
Number registration	Year	Cultural works	Domain
201300035	2013	Bidai (Bide')	Traditional Crafts Skills and Proficiency
201300036	2013	Songket Sambas	Traditional Crafts Skills and Proficiency
201400148	2014	Nyobeng	Community Customs, Rites, and Celebrations
201500254	2015	Kledik	Performing Arts
201500255	2015	Bekana	Traditions and Oral Expressions
201500256	2015	Tenun Ikat Dayak	Traditional Crafts Skills and Proficiency
201500257	2015	Bubur Paddas	Traditional Crafts Skills and Proficiency
201600393	2016	Meriam Karbit	Traditional Crafts Skills and Proficiency
201600394	2016	Upacara Robo-robo	Community Customs, Rites, and Celebrations
201700533	2017	Nyangahatn	Traditions and Oral Expressions
201700534	2017	Jonggan	Performing Arts
201700535	2017	Sape Kalimantan Barat	Traditional Crafts Skills and Proficiency
201700536	2017	Tumpang Negeri	Community Customs, Rites, and Celebrations
201700537	2017	Tari Pinggan Sekadau	Performing Arts
201700538	2017	Gawai Dayak Kalimantan Barat	Community Customs, Rites, and Celebrations
201700539	2017	Tenun Corak Insang Kota Pontianak	Traditional Crafts Skills and Proficiency
201700540	2017	Arakan Pengantin Kota Pontianak	Community Customs, Rites, and Celebrations
201700541	2017	Saprahan Melayu Kota Pontianak	Traditions and Oral Expressions
201800758	2018	Panganten Dayak Kanayatn	Community Customs, Rites, and Celebrations
201800759	2018	Faradje'	Community Customs, Rites, and Celebrations
201800760	2018	Naik Dango Dayak Kanayatn	Community Customs, Rites, and Celebrations
201800761	2018	Sayo' Keladi Pontianak	Traditional Crafts Skills and Proficiency
201800762	2018	Pacri Nenas Pontianak	Traditional Crafts Skills and Proficiency
201800763	2018	Silotong	Performing Arts
201800764	2018	Mani' Bunga Setaman Melawi	Community Customs, Rites, and Celebrations
201901034	2019	Ikan Asam Pedas Pontianak	Traditional Crafts Skills and Proficiency
201901035	2019	Tandak Sambas	Performing Arts
201901036	2019	Saprahan Sambas	Community Customs, Rites, and Celebrations
201901037	2019	Senggayong Sukadana	Traditional Crafts Skills and Proficiency
201901038	2019	Ratip Saman Sambas	Performing Arts
201901039	2019	Tari Lesong Mualang	Performing Arts
201901040	2019	Temet	Traditional Crafts Skills and Proficiency
201901041	2019	Pengerih	Traditions and Oral Expressions
201901042	2019	Kawen Adat Samagat Dayak Tamambaloh	Community Customs, Rites, and Celebrations

=== Central Kalimantan ===
Number registration	Year	Cultural works	Domain
201400149	2014	Handep	Knowledge and Habits of Behavior Regarding Nature and the Universe
201400150	2014	Tiwah	Community Customs, Rites, and Celebrations
201500258	2015	Sapundu	Traditional Crafts Skills and Proficiency
201500259	2015	Sansana Bandar	Traditions and Oral Expressions
201500260	2015	Mamapus Lewu	Community Customs, Rites, and Celebrations
201700547	2017	Nahunan	Community Customs, Rites, and Celebrations
201700548	2017	Wadian Dadas	Community Customs, Rites, and Celebrations

=== South Kalimantan ===
Number registration	Year	Cultural works	Domain	Image
201300039	2013	Sasirangan	Traditional Crafts Skills and Proficiency	
201400146	2014	Madihin	Traditions and Oral Expressions	
201400147	2014	Aruh Baharin	Community Customs, Rites, and Celebrations	
201500261	2015	Pasar Terapung	Knowledge and Habits of Behavior Regarding Nature and the Universe	
201500262	2015	Lamut	Traditions and Oral Expressions	
201500263	2015	Kuriding	Performing Arts	
201500264	2015	Bubungan Tinggi	Traditional Crafts Skills and Proficiency	
201500265	2015	Ba'ayun Mulud	Community Customs, Rites, and Celebrations	
201600395	2016	Batatamba	Traditions and Oral Expressions	
201600396	2016	Mamanda	Traditions and Oral Expressions	
201600397	2016	Tari Baksa Kambang	Performing Arts	
201600398	2016	Wayang Kulit Banjar	Performing Arts	
201600399	2016	Air Guci	Traditional Crafts Skills and Proficiency	
201700542	2017	Tari Topeng Banjar	Performing Arts	
201700543	2017	Kuda Gipang	Performing Arts	
201700544	2017	Sinoman Hadrah	Performing Arts	
201700545	2017	Wayang Gung	Performing Arts	
201700546	2017	Balogo	Traditions and Oral Expressions	
201800765	2018	Mappanretasi Pagatan	Community Customs, Rites, and Celebrations	
201800766	2018	Tenun Pagatan	Traditional Crafts Skills and Proficiency	
201800767	2018	Damarwulan Banjarmasin	Performing Arts	
201901043	2019	Nasi Astakona	Traditional Crafts Skills and Proficiency	
201901044	2019	Arsitektur Rumah Lanting	Traditional Crafts Skills and Proficiency	
201901045	2019	Bagasing Kalimantan Selatan	Traditional Crafts Skills and Proficiency	
201901046	2019	Anyaman Purun Kalimantan Selatan	Traditional Crafts Skills and Proficiency	
201901047	2019	Kurung-kurung	Traditional Crafts Skills and Proficiency	
201901048	2019	Bawanang	Community Customs, Rites, and Celebrations	
201901049	2019	Itatamba Banua	Community Customs, Rites, and Celebrations	
201901050	2019	Ma'iwuu	Community Customs, Rites, and Celebrations	
201901051	2019	Nimbuk	Community Customs, Rites, and Celebrations	

=== East Kalimantan ===
Number of registration	Yeat	Cultural works	Domain
201300040	2013	Ulap Doyo	Traditional Crafts Skills and Proficiency
201300041	2013	Belian Bawo	Community Customs, Rites, and Celebrations
201300042	2013	Hudoq	Performing Arts
201500266	2015	Upacara Adat Kwangkay	Community Customs, Rites, and Celebrations
201500267	2015	Undang-Undang Kerajaan Kutai (UU Panju Selaten)	Knowledge and Habits of Behavior Regarding Nature and the Universe
201500268	2015	Lom Plai	Community Customs, Rites, and Celebrations
201500269	2015	Mandau	Traditional Crafts Skills and Proficiency
201500270	2015	Blontang	Traditional Crafts Skills and Proficiency
201600400	2016	Erau Kartanegara	Community Customs, Rites, and Celebrations
201600401	2016	Sarung Tenun Samarinda	Traditional Crafts Skills and Proficiency
201600402	2016	Petis Udang Paser	Traditional Crafts Skills and Proficiency
201700549	2017	Ronggeng Paser	Performing Arts
201901024	2019	Genikng	Performing Arts
201901025	2019	Ganjur	Performing Arts
201901026	2019	Tari Gong	Performing Arts
201901027	2019	Kelentangan Kutai Barat	Performing Arts
201901028	2019	Tari Perang Dayak Bahau Saq	Performing Arts
201901029	2019	Suliikng Dewa	Performing Arts
201901030	2019	Tari Dewa Memanah	Performing Arts
201901031	2019	Ngerangkau	Community Customs, Rites, and Celebrations
201901032	2019	Sapeq Kalimantan Timur	Performing Arts
201901033	2019	Ngarang	Community Customs, Rites, and Celebrations

=== North Kalimantan ===
Number of registration	Year	Cultural works	Domain
201500271	2015	Upacara Nata Umo Maipunsubon Sawat Dangan	Community Customs, Rites, and Celebrations
201500272	2015	Niva bi'o Mepung Tukung	Community Customs, Rites, and Celebrations
201500273	2015	Incaut	Community Customs, Rites, and Celebrations
201500274	2015	Bepadaw	Community Customs, Rites, and Celebrations
201600403	2016	Na' Ngadan Amai Bio (Upacara Adat Kenyah)	Community Customs, Rites, and Celebrations
201600404	2016	Ngukab Fulung, Ngripak Ulung (Upacara Adat Dayak Lundayeh)	Knowledge and Habits of Behavior Regarding Nature and the Universe
201600405	2016	Jugit Demaring (Tari Klasik Kesultanan Bulungan)	Performing Arts
201600406	2016	Bening dayak kenyah kalimantan utara (Gendongan Bayi)	Traditional Crafts Skills and Proficiency
201700550	2017	Jatung Utang	Performing Arts
201700551	2017	Lalatip	Performing Arts
201700552	2017	Penurunan Padaw Tuju Dulung	Community Customs, Rites, and Celebrations
201800768	2018	Biduk Bebandung	Community Customs, Rites, and Celebrations
201800769	2018	Bebelen/ Bebalong/Babili	Traditions and Oral Expressions
201800770	2018	Melah dan Lakin Ngayau	Community Customs, Rites, and Celebrations
201800771	2018	Inter Kesuma	Traditional Crafts Skills and Proficiency
201800772	2018	Betik Dayak Kenyah Uma' Lung	Traditional Crafts Skills and Proficiency
201901021	2019	Dolop	Community Customs, Rites, and Celebrations
201901022	2019	Mamat	Community Customs, Rites, and Celebrations
201901023	2019	Pekiban	Community Customs, Rites, and Celebrations

=== Bali ===
Number of registration	Year	Cultural works	Domain
201300034	2013	Makepung	Traditions and Oral Expressions
201400142	2014	Performing Arts Tektekan Bali	Performing Arts
201500238	2015	Gringsing Tenganan	Traditional Crafts Skills and Proficiency
201500239	2015	Endek	Traditional Crafts Skills and Proficiency
201500240	2015	Sangging Kamasan Bali	Traditional Crafts Skills and Proficiency
201500241	2015	Barong Ket	Performing Arts
201500242	2015	Joged	Performing Arts
201500243	2015	Tari Legong Kraton	Performing Arts
201500244	2015	Dramatari Wayang Wong	Performing Arts
201500245	2015	Dramatari Gambuh	Performing Arts
201500246	2015	Topeng Sidakarya	Performing Arts
201500247	2015	Baris Upacara	Performing Arts
201500248	2015	Tari Sanghyang	Performing Arts
201500249	2015	Rejang	Performing Arts
201600379	2016	Ngrebeg Mekotek	Community Customs, Rites, and Celebrations
201600380	2016	Ter-teran	Community Customs, Rites, and Celebrations
201600381	2016	Gebug Ende	Community Customs, Rites, and Celebrations
201700553	2017	Betutu	Traditional Crafts Skills and Proficiency
201700554	2017	Kare-kare Tenganan Pegringsingan	Community Customs, Rites, and Celebrations
201700555	2017	Gamelan Selonding	Performing Arts
201700556	2017	Usaba Dangsil	Community Customs, Rites, and Celebrations
201700557	2017	Usaba Sumbu	Community Customs, Rites, and Celebrations
201700558	2017	Siat Tipat Bantal	Community Customs, Rites, and Celebrations
201700559	2017	Tari Leko	Performing Arts
201800738	2018	Siat Geni Desa Adat Tuban	Community Customs, Rites, and Celebrations
201800739	2018	Jegog Jembrana	Performing Arts
201800740	2018	Terompong Beruk	Performing Arts
201800741	2018	Megibung	Community Customs, Rites, and Celebrations
201800742	2018	Mesabat-Sabatan Biu	Community Customs, Rites, and Celebrations
201800743	2018	Songket Beratan	Traditional Crafts Skills and Proficiency
201800744	2018	Tari Baris Wayang Lumintang	Performing Arts
201800745	2018	Tari Baris Cina Renon dan Sanur	Performing Arts
201800746	2018	Basmerah (Nyambleh Sasih Kanem) Desa Taman Pohmanis	Community Customs, Rites, and Celebrations
201800747	2018	Ngarebong Kesiman	Community Customs, Rites, and Celebrations
201800748	2018	Seni Lukis Batuan	Traditional Crafts Skills and Proficiency
201800749	2018	Tari Taruna Jaya	Performing Arts
201800750	2018	Nyakan Diwang	Community Customs, Rites, and Celebrations
201900998	2019	Kerajinan Perak Celuk	Traditional Crafts Skills and Proficiency
201900999	2019	Asta Kosala Kosali	Knowledge and Habits of Behavior Regarding Nature and the Universe
201901000	2019	Baris Sumbu Desa Adat Semanik	Community Customs, Rites, and Celebrations
201901001	2019	Gerabah Banjar Basang Tamiang	Traditional Crafts Skills and Proficiency
201901002	2019	Mabuug Buugan Desa Adat Kedonganan	Community Customs, Rites, and Celebrations
201901003	2019	Ngaro Banjar Medura Intaran Sanur	Community Customs, Rites, and Celebrations
201901004	2019	Legong Binoh	Performing Arts
201901005	2019	Janger Kedaton Sumerta dan Pegok Sesetan	Performing Arts
201901006	2019	Sate Renteng	Traditional Crafts Skills and Proficiency
201901007	2019	Usaba Dimel Desa Adat Selat	Community Customs, Rites, and Celebrations
201901008	2019	Cakepung Budhakeling	Performing Arts
201901009	2019	Penting	Performing Arts
201901010	2019	Ngrebeg Keris Ki Baru Gajah	Community Customs, Rites, and Celebrations
201901011	2019	Pengalantaka	Knowledge and Habits of Behavior Regarding Nature and the Universe
201901012	2019	Baris Jangkang	Community Customs, Rites, and Celebrations
201901013	2019	Gambuh Desa Adat Tumbakbayuh	Performing Arts

=== West Nusa Tenggara ===
Number of registration	Year	Cultural works	Domain	Image
201300057	2013	Gendang Beleq	Performing Arts	
201300058	2013	Wayang Kulit Sasak	Performing Arts	
201400143	2014	Perisean	Community Customs, Rites, and Celebrations	
201500250	2015	Ayam Taliwang	Traditional Crafts Skills and Proficiency	
201600382	2016	Pacoa Jara, Pacu Mbojo	Traditional Crafts Skills and Proficiency	
201600383	2016	Gegerok Tandak	Community Customs, Rites, and Celebrations	
201700560	2017	Kareku Kandei	Community Customs, Rites, and Celebrations	
201800751	2018	Bau Nyale	Community Customs, Rites, and Celebrations	
201800752	2018	Tenun Pringgasela	Traditional Crafts Skills and Proficiency	
201901014	2019	Kayaq Sandongan	Performing Arts	
201901015	2019	Tari Sireh	Performing Arts	

=== East Nusa Tenggara ===
Number of registration	Year	Cultural works	Domain
201300059	2013	Sasandu (Sasando)	Performing Arts
201300060	2013	Caci	Traditions and Oral Expressions
201300061	2013	Rumah Bale (Arsitektur Sumba)	Traditional Crafts Skills and Proficiency
201300075	2013	Tenun Ikat Sumba	Traditional Crafts Skills and Proficiency
201400144	2014	Lodok	Knowledge and Habits of Behavior Regarding Nature and the Universe
201400145	2014	Penti Weki Peso Beo Reca Rangga Wali Ntaung	Community Customs, Rites, and Celebrations
201500251	2015	Mbaru Niang Wae Rebo	Knowledge and Habits of Behavior Regarding Nature and the Universe
201500252	2015	Pasola	Community Customs, Rites, and Celebrations
201500253	2015	Etu	Traditions and Oral Expressions
201600384	2016	Repit	Community Customs, Rites, and Celebrations
201600385	2016	Kure	Community Customs, Rites, and Celebrations
201600386	2016	Wulla Podu	Community Customs, Rites, and Celebrations
201600387	2016	Leru Weru (Upacara Pesta Kacang)	Community Customs, Rites, and Celebrations
201600388	2016	Matekio	Community Customs, Rites, and Celebrations
201600389	2016	Reba	Community Customs, Rites, and Celebrations
201600390	2016	Tarian Likurai	Performing Arts
201600391	2016	Tarian Pado'a	Performing Arts
201600392	2016	Se'i	Traditional Crafts Skills and Proficiency
201700561	2017	Bonet	Performing Arts
201800753	2018	Leva Nuang	Community Customs, Rites, and Celebrations
201800754	2018	Ela Ma	Community Customs, Rites, and Celebrations
201800755	2018	Hole	Community Customs, Rites, and Celebrations
201800756	2018	Lego-Lego	Traditions and Oral Expressions
201800757	2018	Vera	Traditions and Oral Expressions
201901016	2019	Ikat Tenun Sikka	Traditional Crafts Skills and Proficiency
201901017	2019	Mangenjing	Community Customs, Rites, and Celebrations
201901018	2019	Ala Baloe	Community Customs, Rites, and Celebrations
201901019	2019	Kebalai	Performing Arts
201901020	2019	Gawi	Community Customs, Rites, and Celebrations

=== West Sulawesi ===
Nomor registration	Year	Cultural works	Domain
201300046	2013	Saiyyang Pattu'du	Performing Arts
201400156	2014	Passayang-sayang	Traditions and Oral Expressions
201400157	2014	Sandeq	Knowledge and Habits of Behavior Regarding Nature and the Universe
201500278	2015	Loka Sattai/Loka Ro'do/Loka Anjoroi	Traditional Crafts Skills and Proficiency
201500279	2015	Kain Tenun Sukomandi	Traditional Crafts Skills and Proficiency
201600413	2016	Mangaro	Community Customs, Rites, and Celebrations
201600414	2016	Perkawinan adat Mandar	Community Customs, Rites, and Celebrations
201600415	2016	Keke	Traditional Crafts Skills and Proficiency
201600416	2016	Calong	Traditional Crafts Skills and Proficiency
201600417	2016	Masossor Manurung	Community Customs, Rites, and Celebrations
201700568	2017	Lipa Saqbe Mandar	Traditional Crafts Skills and Proficiency
201800794	2018	Mappatammaq Al-Quran	Community Customs, Rites, and Celebrations
201800795	2018	Maulidan Salabose	Community Customs, Rites, and Celebrations
201800796	2018	Pupu	Traditional Crafts Skills and Proficiency
201901066	2019	Kaliandaqdaq	Traditions and Oral Expressions
201901067	2019	Sibaliparri	Knowledge and Habits of Behavior Regarding Nature and the Universe
201901068	2019	Pande Bassi	Traditional Crafts Skills and Proficiency
201901069	2019	Pakacaping Tommuane	Performing Arts
201901070	2019	Pannette	Traditional Crafts Skills and Proficiency

=== South Sulawesi ===
Number of registration	Year	Cultural works	Domain
201300052	2013	Pinisi	Knowledge and Habits of Behavior Regarding Nature and the Universe
201300053	2013	Pa'gellu	Performing Arts
201300054	2013	Sinriliq	Traditions and Oral Expressions
201300055	2013	Pakkarena	Performing Arts
201400161	2014	Pepepepeka Ri Makka	Performing Arts
201400162	2014	Tongkonan	Traditional Crafts Skills and Proficiency
201400163	2014	Badik	Traditional Crafts Skills and Proficiency
201500275	2015	Ma'badong	Community Customs, Rites, and Celebrations
201500276	2015	Ganrang	Performing Arts
201500277	2015	Coto Makassar	Traditional Crafts Skills and Proficiency
201600407	2016	Ma'raga	Traditional Crafts Skills and Proficiency
201600408	2016	Mappadendang	Community Customs, Rites, and Celebrations
201600409	2016	Tudang Sipulung	Community Customs, Rites, and Celebrations
201600410	2016	Mappalili Sigeri	Community Customs, Rites, and Celebrations
201600411	2016	Maudu Lompoa	Community Customs, Rites, and Celebrations
201600412	2016	Lipa Sabbe	Traditional Crafts Skills and Proficiency
201700562	2017	Maccera Manurung Kaluppini (Enrekang)	Community Customs, Rites, and Celebrations
201700563	2017	Tari Salonreng	Performing Arts
201700564	2017	Barongko	Traditional Crafts Skills and Proficiency
201700565	2017	Balla To Kajang (Rumah Kajang)	Traditional Crafts Skills and Proficiency
201700566	2017	Kelong Pakkiyo Bunting	Traditions and Oral Expressions
201700567	2017	Passura'	Traditional Crafts Skills and Proficiency
201800773	2018	Rumah Adat Karampuang	Traditional Crafts Skills and Proficiency
201800774	2018	Kapurung	Traditional Crafts Skills and Proficiency
201800775	2018	Pajjaga Bone Balla	Performing Arts
201800776	2018	Kajangki	Performing Arts
201800777	2018	Gambus Ogi	Performing Arts
201800778	2018	Songkabala Accera Kalompoang	Community Customs, Rites, and Celebrations
201800779	2018	Parade Pasukan A'jaga Tubarani	Performing Arts
201800780	2018	Sirawu' Sulo/Sirempek Api	Traditions and Oral Expressions
201800781	2018	Mattopang Arajang	Community Customs, Rites, and Celebrations
201800782	2018	Rambu Solo'	Community Customs, Rites, and Celebrations
201800783	2018	Annyorong Lopi	Community Customs, Rites, and Celebrations
201800784	2018	Mangrara Banua	Community Customs, Rites, and Celebrations
201800785	2018	Mappogau Hanua Sinjai	Community Customs, Rites, and Celebrations
201800786	2018	Marrimpa Salo Sinjai	Community Customs, Rites, and Celebrations
201800787	2018	Kelong Batti'-Batti'	Traditions and Oral Expressions
201800788	2018	Maccera Arajang	Community Customs, Rites, and Celebrations
201800789	2018	Songko To Bone/Songko Recca	Traditional Crafts Skills and Proficiency
201800790	2018	Mappacci	Community Customs, Rites, and Celebrations
201800791	2018	Passureq	Traditions and Oral Expressions
201800792	2018	Mangaru'	Traditions and Oral Expressions
201800793	2018	Mallangi Arajang Ri Goarie	Community Customs, Rites, and Celebrations
201901052	2019	Kondobuleng	Traditions and Oral Expressions
201901053	2019	Massulo Beppa	Community Customs, Rites, and Celebrations
201901054	2019	Maccera Tasi	Community Customs, Rites, and Celebrations
201901055	2019	Didek	Traditions and Oral Expressions
201901056	2019	Salokoa	Community Customs, Rites, and Celebrations

=== Central Sulawesi ===
Numberb of registration	Year	Cultural works	Domain
201500282	2015	Kain Tenun Donggala	Traditional Crafts Skills and Proficiency
201500283	2015	Upacara Melabot Tumpe	Community Customs, Rites, and Celebrations
201600421	2016	Padungku	Community Customs, Rites, and Celebrations
201700574	2017	Kaledo	Traditional Crafts Skills and Proficiency
201700575	2017	Kakula	Traditions and Oral Expressions
201800798	2018	Dade Ndate	Traditions and Oral Expressions
201800799	2018	Modulu-Dulu	Community Customs, Rites, and Celebrations
201901057	2019	Nobalia	Community Customs, Rites, and Celebrations
201901058	2019	Guma Sulawesi Tengah	Traditional Crafts Skills and Proficiency
201901059	2019	Lalove	Traditional Crafts Skills and Proficiency
201901060	2019	Torompio	Performing Arts
201901061	2019	Vaino	Traditions and Oral Expressions

=== Southeast Sulawesi ===
Number registration	Year	Cultural	Domain
201300047	2013	Tari Raigo	Performing Arts
201300048	2013	Kalosara	Knowledge and Habits of Behavior Regarding Nature and the Universe
201300049	2013	Kabanti	Traditions and Oral Expressions
201300050	2013	Lariangi	Performing Arts
201300051	2013	Kaghati	Traditions and Oral Expressions
201400158	2014	Mosehe	Community Customs, Rites, and Celebrations
201400159	2014	Lulo	Performing Arts
201400160	2014	Karia	Community Customs, Rites, and Celebrations
201500280	2015	Tari Linda	Performing Arts
201700569	2017	Kantola	Traditions and Oral Expressions
201700570	2017	Istana Malige Buton	Traditional Crafts Skills and Proficiency
201700571	2017	Kaago-Ago	Community Customs, Rites, and Celebrations

=== North Sulawesi ===
Number of registration	Year	Cultural works	Domain
201300043	2013	Tari Maengket	Performing Arts
201300044	2013	Mane'e	Pengetahuan dan kebiasaan perilaku mengenai alam dan semesta
201300045	2013	Kolintang	Performing Arts
201400151	2014	Tulude	Community Customs, Rites, and Celebrations
201400152	2014	Kain Koffo	Traditional Crafts Skills and Proficiency
201400153	2014	Kabela	Traditional Crafts Skills and Proficiency
201500281	2015	Musik Bia	Performing Arts
201600418	2016	Tagonggong	Traditional Crafts Skills and Proficiency
201600419	2016	Mogama	Community Customs, Rites, and Celebrations
201600420	2016	Monibi	Community Customs, Rites, and Celebrations
201700572	2017	Masamper	Performing Arts
201700573	2017	Tinutuan	Traditional Crafts Skills and Proficiency
201800797	2018	Figura	Performing Arts
201901062	2019	Gunde	Performing Arts
201901063	2019	Cakalang Fufu Sulawesi Utara	Traditional Crafts Skills and Proficiency
201901064	2019	Wale Wangko	Traditional Crafts Skills and Proficiency
201901065	2019	Sopulut	Traditional Crafts Skills and Proficiency

=== Gorontalo ===
Number of registration	Year	Cultural works	Domain
201300056	2013	Molapi Saronde	Performing Arts
201400154	2014	Tumbilotohe	Community Customs, Rites, and Celebrations
201400155	2014	Karawo	Traditional Crafts Skills and Proficiency
201500284	2015	Permainan Polo Palo	Traditions and Oral Expressions
201500285	2015	Tradisi Lisan Tanggomo	Traditions and Oral Expressions
201600422	2016	Lohidu	Traditions and Oral Expressions
201600423	2016	Tahuli	Traditions and Oral Expressions
201600424	2016	Dayango/Wumbungo	Community Customs, Rites, and Celebrations
201600425	2016	Langga	Performing Arts
201600426	2016	Binthe Biluhuta	Traditional Crafts Skills and Proficiency
201700576	2017	Paiya Lohungo Lopoli	Traditions and Oral Expressions
201700577	2017	Tuja'i	Traditions and Oral Expressions
201700578	2017	Wunungo	Traditions and Oral Expressions
201700579	2017	Tidi Lopolopalo	Traditions and Oral Expressions
201700580	2017	Palebohu	Traditions and Oral Expressions
201800800	2018	Dikili	Community Customs, Rites, and Celebrations
201800801	2018	Me'eraji	Traditions and Oral Expressions
201800802	2018	Pulanga	Community Customs, Rites, and Celebrations
201800803	2018	Momeati	Traditions and Oral Expressions
201800804	2018	Molalunga	Community Customs, Rites, and Celebrations
201800805	2018	Momuhuto	Community Customs, Rites, and Celebrations
201800806	2018	Tolobalango	Traditions and Oral Expressions
201800807	2018	Bantayo Poboide	Knowledge and Habits of Behavior Regarding Nature and the Universe
201901071	2019	Upiya Karanji	Traditional Crafts Skills and Proficiency
201901072	2019	Molontalo	Community Customs, Rites, and Celebrations
201901073	2019	Mohuntingo	Community Customs, Rites, and Celebrations
201901074	2019	Tidi Lo o'ayabu	Performing Arts
201901075	2019	Ilabulo	Traditional Crafts Skills and Proficiency
201901076	2019	Tiliaya	Traditional Crafts Skills and Proficiency
201901077	2019	Tepa Tonggo	Traditions and Oral Expressions

=== Maluku ===
Number of registration	Year	Cultural works	Domain
201300062	2013	Ehe Lawn	Performing Arts
201300063	2013	Tais Pet	Traditional Crafts Skills and Proficiency
201300064	2013	Maku-maku	Performing Arts
201400164	2014	Rofaer War (Cuci Parigi)	Community Customs, Rites, and Celebrations
201400165	2014	Tyarka	Traditions and Oral Expressions
201400166	2014	Poya	Performing Arts
201500286	2015	Cuci Negeri Soya	Community Customs, Rites, and Celebrations
201500287	2015	Inasua	Traditional Crafts Skills and Proficiency
201500288	2015	Obor Pattimura	Community Customs, Rites, and Celebrations
201500289	2015	Pela	Knowledge and Habits of Behavior Regarding Nature and the Universe
201600427	2016	Sasi Maluku	Knowledge and Habits of Behavior Regarding Nature and the Universe
201600428	2016	Pukul Sapu	Community Customs, Rites, and Celebrations
201600429	2016	Belang Banda	Community Customs, Rites, and Celebrations
201600430	2016	Sopi	Traditional Crafts Skills and Proficiency
201600431	2016	Baileo	Traditional Crafts Skills and Proficiency
201700581	2017	Minyak Kayu Putih	Knowledge and Habits of Behavior Regarding Nature and the Universe
201700582	2017	Dansa Tali	Performing Arts
201700583	2017	Enbal	Knowledge and Habits of Behavior Regarding Nature and the Universe
201700584	2017	Tahuri	Traditional Crafts Skills and Proficiency
201800808	2018	Pataheri/Matahena	Community Customs, Rites, and Celebrations
201800809	2018	Gula Saparua	Traditional Crafts Skills and Proficiency
201800810	2018	Tari Lenso	Performing Arts
201901078	2019	Bameti	Knowledge and Habits of Behavior Regarding Nature and the Universe

=== North Maluku ===
Number of registration	Year	Cultural works	Domain
201300065	2013	Bambu Gila	Traditions and Oral Expressions
201300066	2013	Soya-soya	Performing Arts
201500290	2015	Hibualamo	Traditional Crafts Skills and Proficiency
201500291	2015	Tari Legu Sahu	Performing Arts
201600432	2016	Seri Godoba	Community Customs, Rites, and Celebrations
201600433	2016	Tide-Tide	Performing Arts
201600434	2016	Kukuhana	Traditional Crafts Skills and Proficiency
201700585	2017	Sasadu	Traditional Crafts Skills and Proficiency
201800811	2018	Yangere/Tali Dua Halmahera Utara	Performing Arts
201800812	2018	Rion-Rion	Community Customs, Rites, and Celebrations
201901079	2019	Adat Pia Bakai	Community Customs, Rites, and Celebrations
201901080	2019	Halua Kanari Maluku Utara	Traditional Crafts Skills and Proficiency
201901081	2019	Laka Baka	Performing Arts
201901082	2019	Bela Yai	Performing Arts

=== West Papua ===
Number of registration	Year	Cultural works	Domain
201500292	2015	Papeda	Traditional Crafts Skills and Proficiency
201600441	2016	Banondit (Rumput Kebar)	Knowledge and Habits of Behavior Regarding Nature and the Universe
201600442	2016	Bihim (Tari Tumbutana)	Community Customs, Rites, and Celebrations
201600443	2016	Mod Aki Aksa Igkojei	Traditional Crafts Skills and Proficiency
201600444	2016	Igya Ser Hanjop	Knowledge and Habits of Behavior Regarding Nature and the Universe
201700589	2017	Fararior	Community Customs, Rites, and Celebrations
201700590	2017	Farbakbuk	Community Customs, Rites, and Celebrations
201700591	2017	Kuk Kir Kna	Community Customs, Rites, and Celebrations
201700592	2017	Mansorandak	Community Customs, Rites, and Celebrations
201700593	2017	Mbaham- Matta/Ko On Kno Mi Mombi Du Qpona	Community Customs, Rites, and Celebrations
201700594	2017	Anu Beta Tubat	Knowledge and Habits of Behavior Regarding Nature and the Universe
201901084	2019	Wala	Performing Arts
201901085	2019	Srar	Performing Arts
201901086	2019	Orok	Performing Arts

=== Papua ===
Number of registration	Year	Cultural works	Domain	Image
201300067	2013	Yosim Pancar	Performing Arts	
201300068	2013	Ukiran Asmat	Traditional Crafts Skills and Proficiency	
201300077	2013	Noken	Traditional Crafts Skills and Proficiency	
201500293	2015	Tomaku Baku	Traditional Crafts Skills and Proficiency	
201500294	2015	Koteka	Traditional Crafts Skills and Proficiency	
201600435	2016	Wor Biak	Community Customs, Rites, and Celebrations	
201600436	2016	Elha	Knowledge and Habits of Behavior Regarding Nature and the Universe	
201600437	2016	Aker	Knowledge and Habits of Behavior Regarding Nature and the Universe	
201600438	2016	Honai	Traditional Crafts Skills and Proficiency	
201600439	2016	Khombow	Traditional Crafts Skills and Proficiency	
201600440	2016	Terfo	Traditional Crafts Skills and Proficiency	
201700586	2017	Ndambu	Community Customs, Rites, and Celebrations	
201700587	2017	Yu	Community Customs, Rites, and Celebrations	
201700588	2017	Pokem	Traditional Crafts Skills and Proficiency	
201800813	2018	Aimaro Hena Taje	Community Customs, Rites, and Celebrations	
201800814	2018	Bhukere	Knowledge and Habits of Behavior Regarding Nature and the Universe	
201800815	2018	Sireuw	Traditional Crafts Skills and Proficiency	
201800816	2018	Snap Mor	Knowledge and Habits of Behavior Regarding Nature and the Universe	
201800817	2018	Akonipuk	Knowledge and Habits of Behavior Regarding Nature and the Universe	
201800818	2018	Helaehili	Traditions and Oral Expressions	
201800819	2018	Karamo	Performing Arts	
201901083	2019	Mbitoro	Traditional Crafts Skills and Proficiency	

== Joint heritage ==
Number of registration	Year	Cultural works	Domain
201300010	2013	Aksara dan Naskah Ka Ga Nga	Traditions and Oral Expressions
201300011	2013	Tabot atau Tabuik	Community Customs, Rites, and Celebrations
201300023	2013	Pantun Betawi	Traditions and Oral Expressions
201300027	2013	Calung Banyumas dan Jawa Barat	Performing Arts
201300037	2013	Rumah Panjang Dayak	Traditional Crafts Skills and Proficiency
201300038	2013	Karungut	Performing Arts
201300069	2013	Barappen	Community Customs, Rites, and Celebrations
201300070	2013	Tifa	Performing Arts
201300071	2013	Batik Indonesia	Traditional Crafts Skills and Proficiency
201300076	2013	Wayang	Performing Arts
201400168	2014	Gamelan Jawa Gaya Surakarta dan Yogyakarta	Performing Arts
201400169	2014	Sekaten	Community Customs, Rites, and Celebrations
201400170	2014	Pawukon	Knowledge and Habits of Behavior Regarding Nature and the Universe
201400171	2014	Mendu	Performing Arts
201400172	2014	Pakaian Kulit Kayu	Traditional Crafts Skills and Proficiency
201400173	2014	Tari Cakalele	Performing Arts

== See also ==
- Culture of Indonesia
- Indonesian art
