= Museum of Asian Art, Kuala Lumpur =

Museum of Asian Art

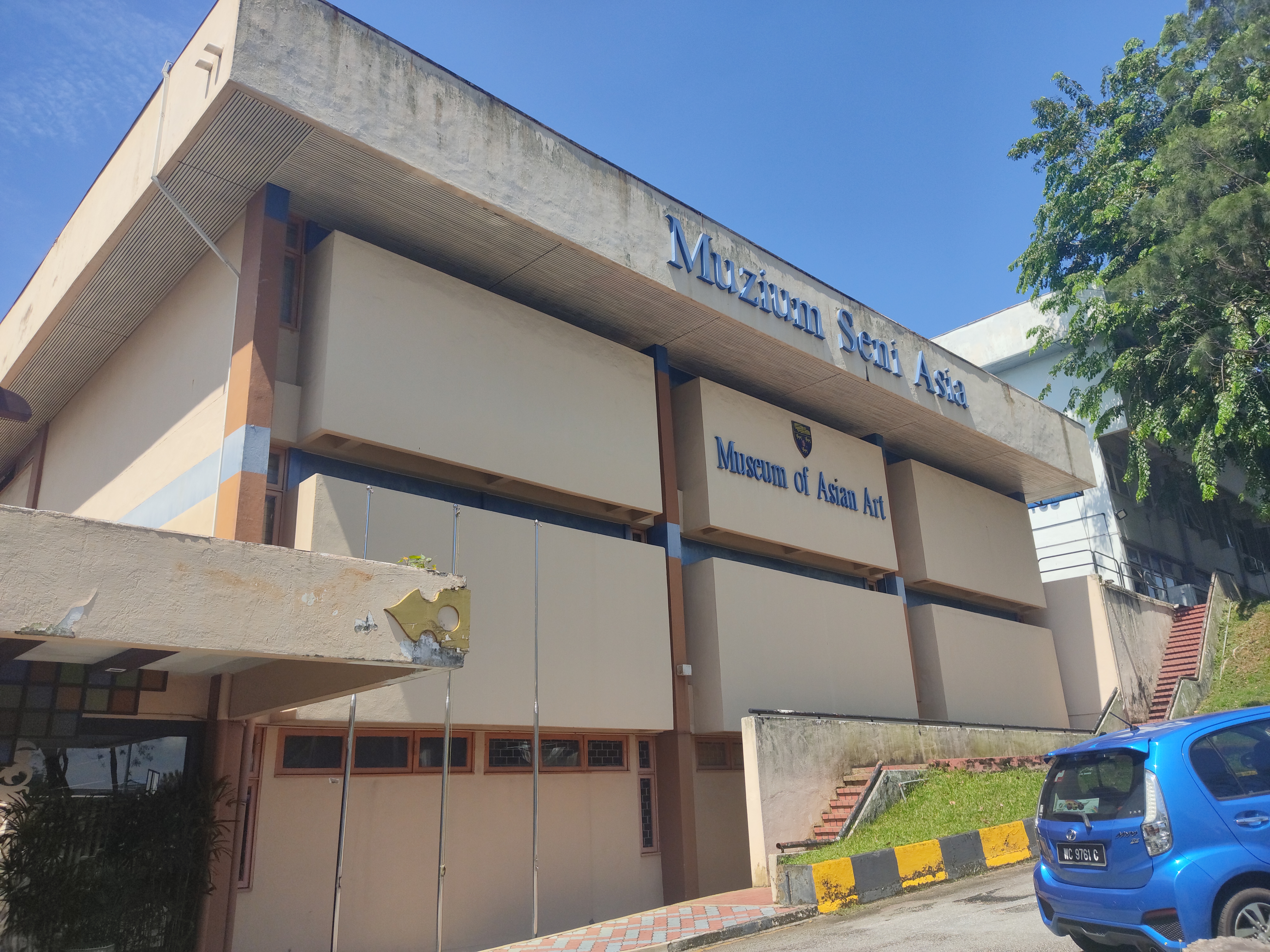
- Established: 1954
- Location: Kuala Lumpur, Malaysia
- Coordinates: 3.118214°N 101.653179°E
- Type: Art museum
- Website: museum.um.edu.my

The Museum of Asian Art (Malay: Muzium Seni Asia) is a museum located in Kuala Lumpur, Malaysia. The museum is dedicated to showcasing different art forms in various parts of the Asian continent.

== History ==
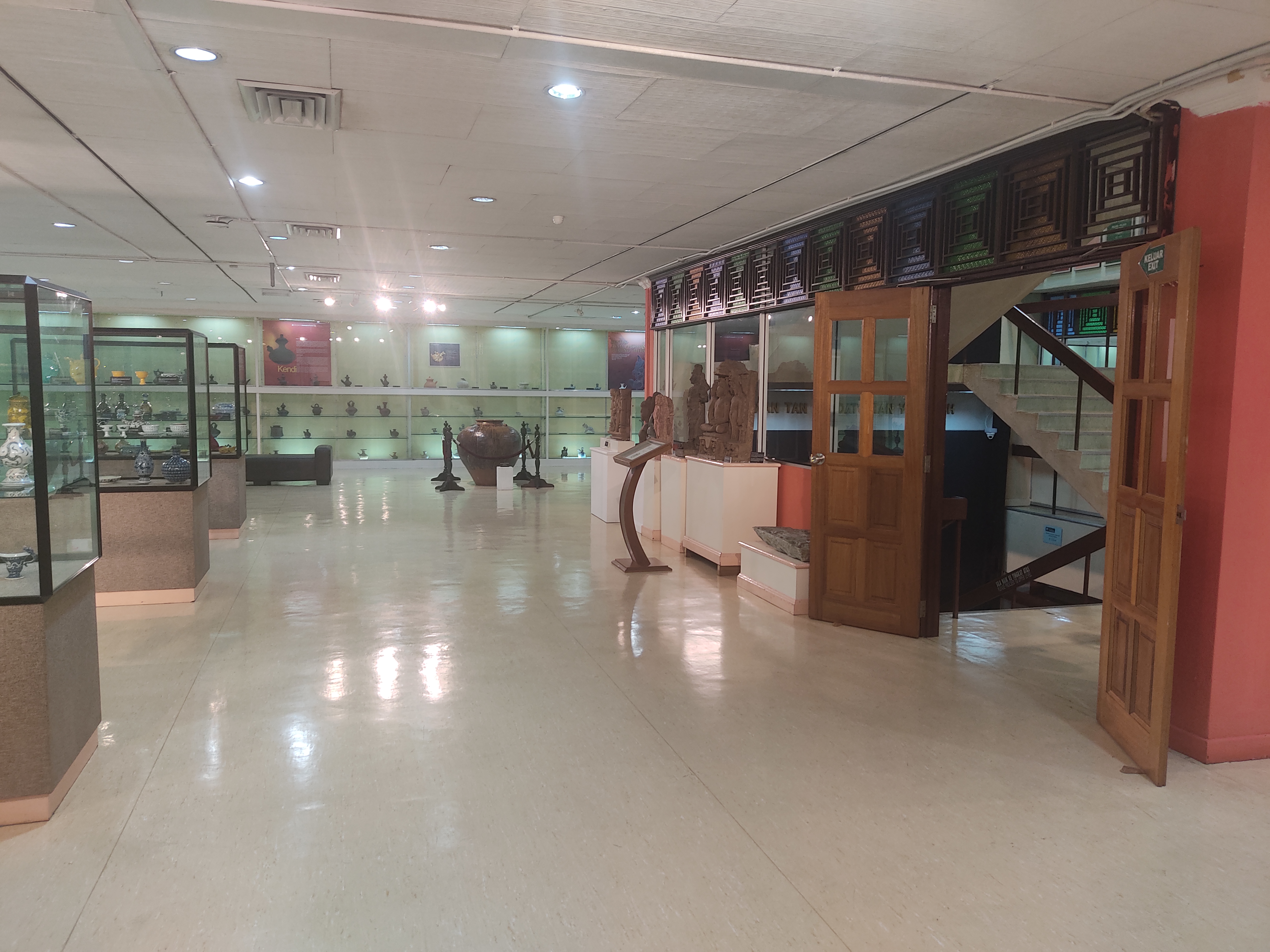
Interior of the museum

The Museum of Asian Art was established as part of the University of Malaya's activities: research, art appreciation and learning process to the new generation. Instead of reading from books, it would be more interesting if a student can learn from the original object from all over the Asian region. Hence, the perspectives are much wider and more comprehensive. In a country like Malaysia, with its markedly heterogeneous ethnic groups, which must seek to live together in harmony, some appreciation of each other's past history and cultural achievements is obviously constructive and integrating in its effect. This is one of the basic premises leading to the creation of the museum. Therefore, Professor Ungku A. Aziz Ungku Abdul Hamid is responsible for the establishment of the museum at the University of Malaya.

With the new approach, Three Civilizations Under One Roof, the Museum of Asian Art has collected various types of cultural artifacts from the Malay and Islamic region, Chinese pottery and Indian religious sculptures. The most extensive songket and Malay artifacts, potteries from the Tang to Qing dynasty, and the art of Sathavahana image, were collected and now displayed as part of university duties to provide the beloved students and country with a message-our ancestor passing a great civilization to the people.

Various masterpieces from the region have been collected and showcased. The collection of the Museum of Asian Art has a long history, having been built up over a period of almost 50 years. The first item on record is a bronze Buddha head from Chiengsen period (1400-1550 AD) Thailand, given to the museum by Kun Krassri Nimanamhasminda in 1954. This contribution marked the beginning of the University of Malaya Art Museum, at that time based in the university's campus in Singapore. The Buddha head was thus acquired several years before the University of Malaya campus was established in Kuala Lumpur in 1962. Prior to that, a section of the university library was used to display the artifact.

The museum's present home was built to accommodate the increasing number of new acquisitions. In June 1980, the new building was built in the scenic area between the Faculty of Economics and the then Law Faculty (currently occupied by the Business and Accounting Faculty). Within its three floors of exhibition space, the museum represents three Civilizations the Indian, the Chinese and the Islamic. The museum now holds one of the most comprehensive collections of Asian art in the region. Its scope and breadth enables the museum to provide an introduction to the major traditions of Asian art such as Chinese, Indian, Khmer, Islamic and Malay coming from the greater Malay world. The collection contains rare and exceptional objects which serve as important reference materials.

The museum is open to the public, with guided tours available upon request.

== Collections ==
The museum contains 7,500 artifacts including Indian sculptures, Chinese ceramics, Indonesian textiles, sacred masks from Orang Asli communities, Sawankhalok pottery from elephant figurines in Thailand, the museum also includes ceramics from Iran, Vietnam and Japan. The museum's art collection dates back 4,000 years of Malay and Asian history. The museum also has a collection of kendi, which are water containers used in Asia. The museum contains a collection of Kraak ware, as well as a statue of a Central Asian Foreigner, believed to be from the Sogdia Empire.

The museum also contains archaeological finds from various beaches in Peninsular Malaysia as well as from Tioman Island. The museum contains one of the largest collections of kendi. In 1979, the museum organized an exhibition of native Malaysian crafts. In 2014, the museum presented an exhibition called "Seeking MH370" that included oil paintings and photographs by 16 artists including U-Wei Shaari and Abdullah Hamdan.

Also in 2014, the museum presented the "Malaysia-Canada Interculture Exhibition: Indigenous Identities", featuring artifacts such as musical instruments, hats, textiles, tools and baskets from indigenous communities in Malaysia and Canada. In March 2017, the museum exhibited 54 fine art works by artist Faizal Sidik, the exhibition was called "Faizal Sidik: Catan Songket". In an October 2017 exhibition, the museum presented 14 works by two female artists Mahzurah Shaari and Marisa Ng, the works included acrylic and oil paintings. In May 2019, an exhibition of works by Elias Yamani Ismail was shown at the museum, these works were made using bricolage techniques.
