= Textiles of Sumba =

Native Indonesian weaving style of Sumbanese

Newsreel footage of a 1965 exposition on Sumba textiles at the Museum voor Land- en Volkenkunde, Rotterdam.

The textiles of Sumba, an island in eastern Indonesia, represent the means by which the present generation passes on its messages to future generations. Sumbanese textiles are deeply personal; they follow a distinct systematic form but also show the individuality of the weavers and the villages where they are produced. Internationally, Sumbanese textiles are collected as examples of textile designs of the highest quality and are found in major museums around the world, as well as in the homes of collectors.

Since the early 1900s, the Dutch were exporting textiles from Sumba. Today, great numbers of textiles are still produced by a relatively small number of women, mainly from the eastern coastal districts of Sumba. These textiles are made not only for export, but also for trade among local people for ritual use, where, by custom, the process of ikat was forbidden.

== Significance and symbolism ==
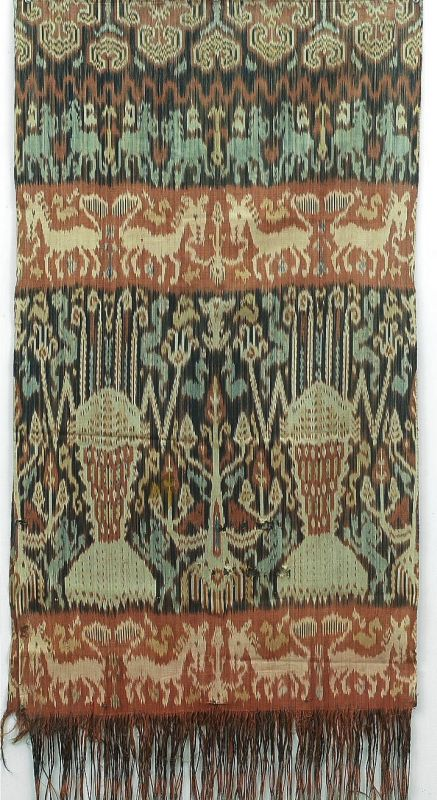
Hinggi, the typical cloth of Eastern Sumba

Since textiles are the products of Sumbanese women, they are viewed as tangible representations of the female element of the bipartite universe. In Sumba, this male-female dynamic is encapsulated in the notion of the Highest Being, who is both the Father Sun and Mother Moon, as well as the Creator or Weaver of human life. The Sumbanese believe individuals are able to acquire the special powers and qualities of certain creatures when textiles displaying such motifs are worn.

Although the appropriate clothes for Sumbanese men and women are different, Sumbanese textiles are seen collectively as a female component of their cosmos. The textiles are both clothing and the currency of traditional ceremonial exchange. Many fine-folded textiles must be presented at each marriage as part of a counter-payment for a bridewealth paid in horses, buffalo, and gold, and at each funeral as a sign of mourning and later also a counter-payment for animals that were contributed for slaughtering. In marriages, the textiles are symbolic and represent dowry from the woman's family, the wife-givers, who are ritually superior on ceremonial occasions. The textiles are a prominent part of reciprocal gift for male dowry, such as metal, buffalo, and ivory from the man's family, whose burden in gift-giving is heavier because of the inferior status of the wife-taker to that of the wife-giver.

The textiles are also traded or given to show that a contract is binding, as a kind of "interest payment" to request for more time to discharge a debt, and as a gesture of gratitude or reciprocation. Within these contexts, the textiles are counted; their collective value is estimated on the basis of materials, workmanship, design, and their relative worth in relation to the livestock traded for it, if any. These estimations value indigo-dyed textiles more than those made with commercial dyes, value hand-spun thread more than store-bought thread, and value labor-intensive techniques of supplementary ikat-dyeing more than simpler and faster designs.

== Weaving and dying techniques ==
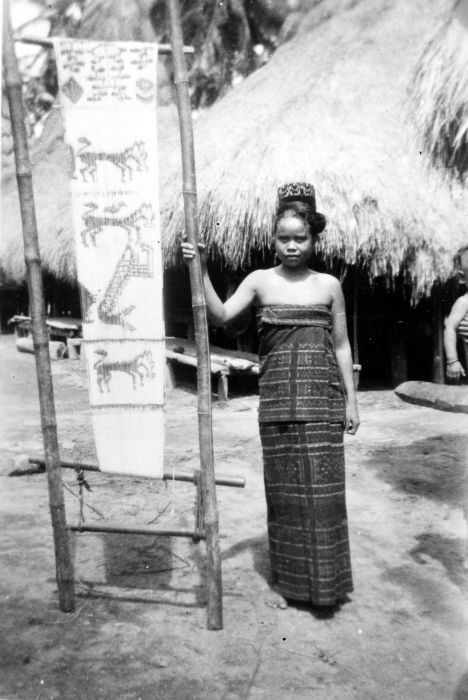
Young woman from Kambera with a piece of cloth tied and ready for dying, 1931

The dominant weaving technique for the hinggi is ikat of the warp, although supplementary weaving of both the warp and weft are sometimes used. For more important textiles, the ends are finished with a tapestry weave.

The process of dyeing the pattern of a particular piece of cloth involves first setting the warp up on a frame, which gives the length of the cloth. In most cases, one end mirrors the other, and the left side of a panel mirrors the right side. Two identical panels are dyed, woven, and then joined. Because the technique is very labor-intensive, the designer, usually the weaver, generally does the setting out and dyeing simultaneously such that two textiles are constructed at the same time.

Women's skirts, the lau, are a plain weave with a variety of decorative techniques added, including embroidery, the application of shells and beads, the supplementary weave of the weft, and, occasionally, ikat.

== Imagery ==
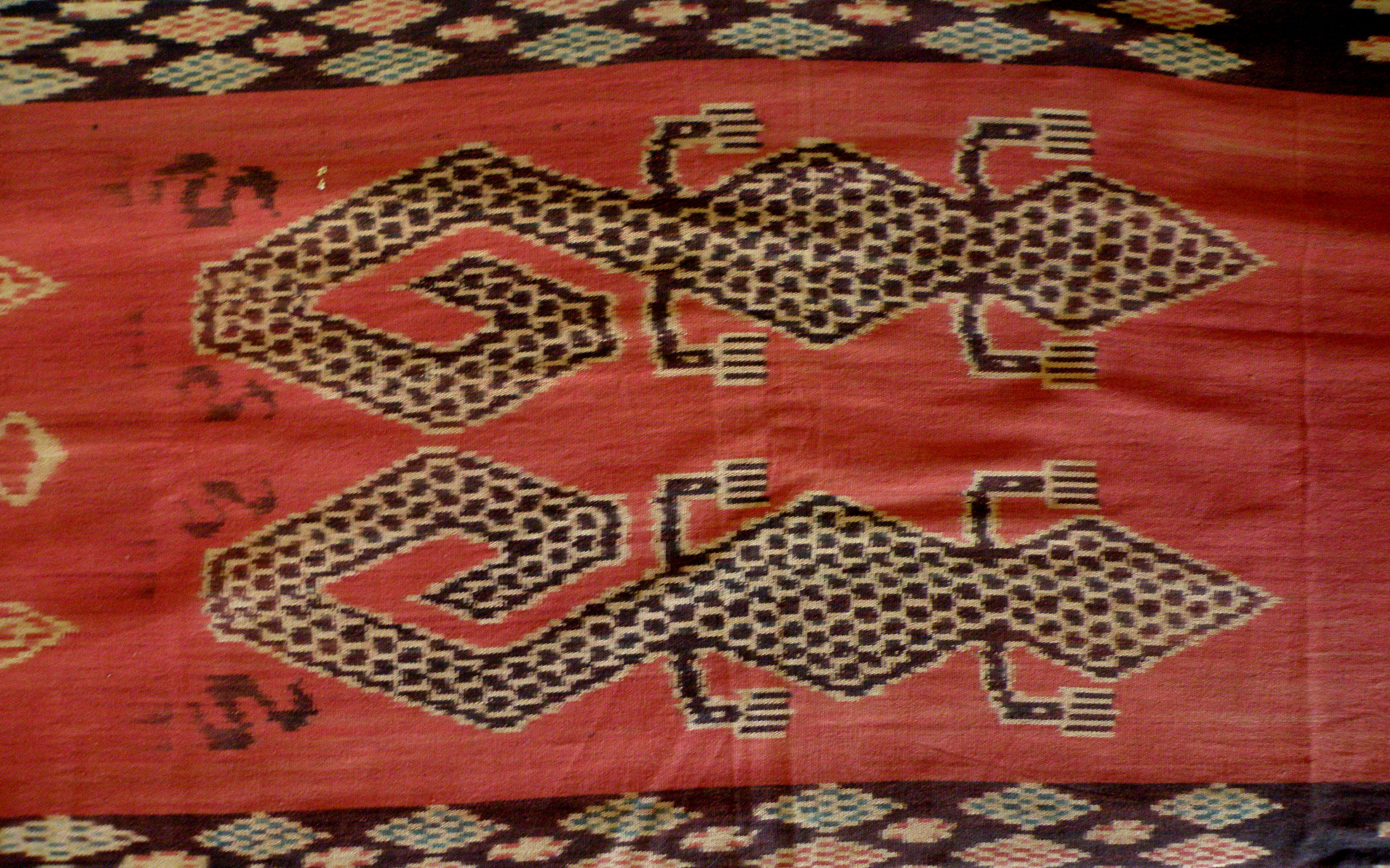
Hinggi detail of a gecko

The identifiable creatures that appear on royal Sumbanese textiles include animals of ritual sacrifice, such as cocks or chickens, as well as deer with spreading horns. Shrimp and lobsters can also be depicted and symbolize rebirth—shrimps because they shed and replace their shells, and lobsters because they can regenerate their limbs in a process of renewal. As such, shrimp and lobsters are symbolic of a ruler's powers.

== Hinggi ==
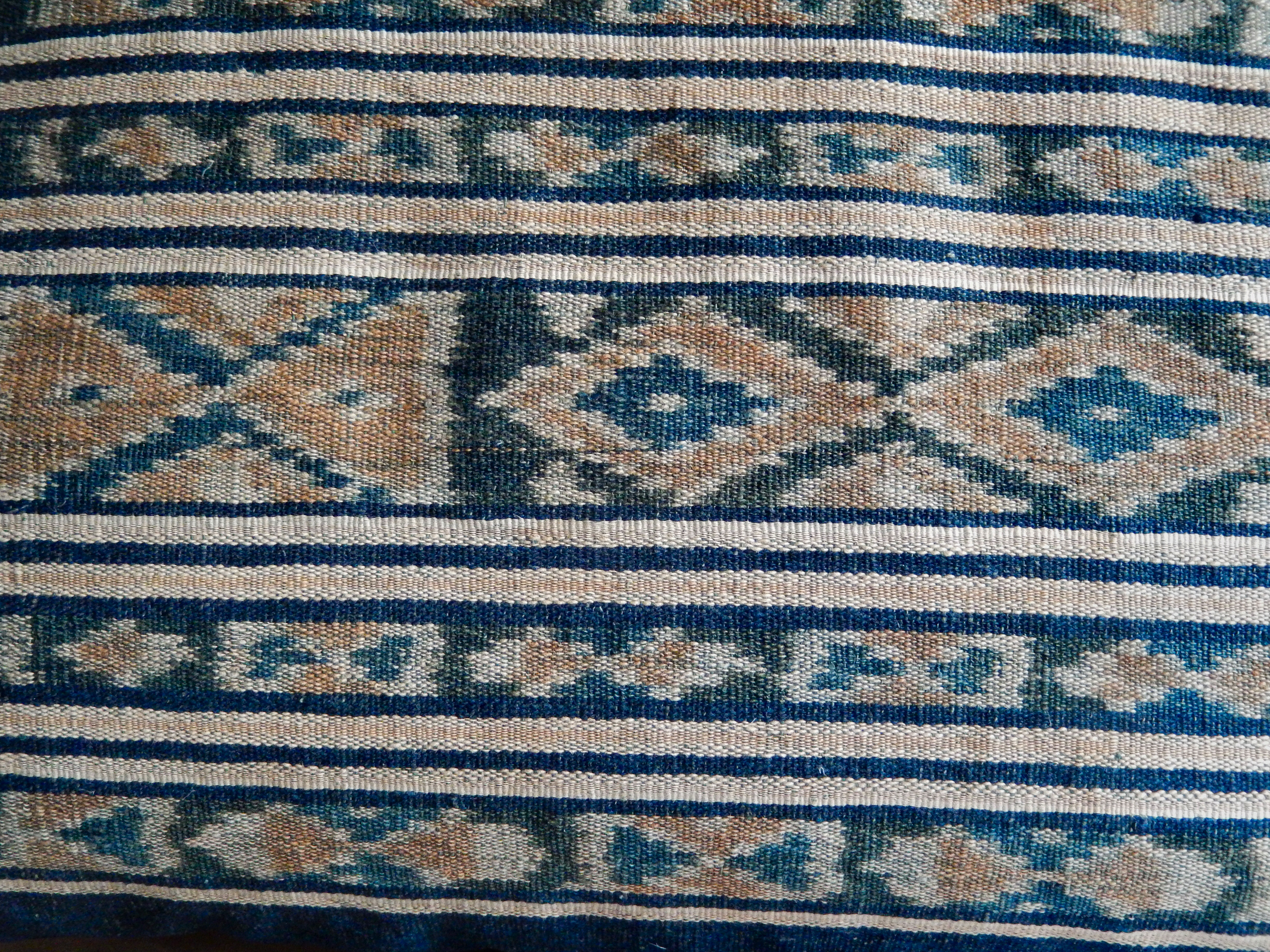
Geometrically patterned Ikat woman's dress of thick cotton. Sumba, mid 20th century

Hinggi are large blankets decorated with warp ikat used for adat exchanges and as men's clothing. They are usually made in pairs; one cloth is wrapped around the hips, and the other is thrown over the shoulder. When designed for nobility, the textiles are usually larger and dyed with red and indigo colors to indicate the statuses of both the wearer and the giver. In the past, only nobles had the right to use and wear such textiles. These textiles were seen only in festivals, where they were worn by nobles, their family members, and retainers as a sign of power and wealth, which was concomitant with the wealth of society. The designs are often based on local animals, such as horses, roosters, deer, snakes, fish, and prawn. Other specifically Sumbanese images include the skull tree and the mamuli, a gold ornament that is also a rank indicator. Foreign symbols, such as dragons from Chinese ceramics and lions from the Dutch coat of arms, are sometimes incorporated in these textiles.

== Lau ==
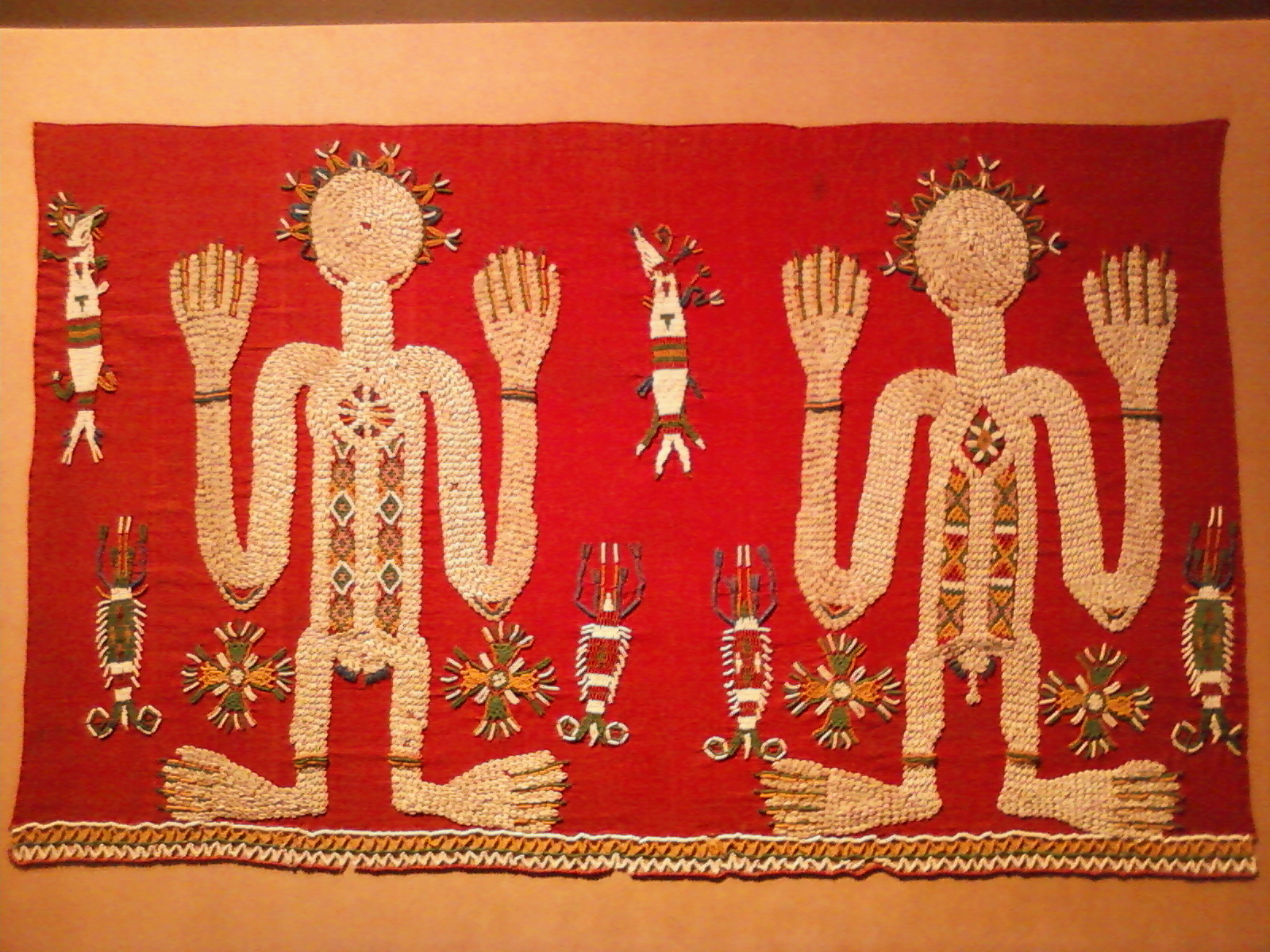
Lau Hada from about 1900, Indianapolis Museum of Art No 33.682

Lau are the tubular skirts worn by women. The same symbols that appear on a man's hinggi reappear on the women's skirts, but the range of techniques used extend beyond ikat alone. These techniques include designs worked by a supplementary weave warp, embroidery, the application of beads and shells, and, occasionally, tufting with supplementary yarns. The figures used in these textiles appear in light-colored yarns on plain backgrounds of dark blue, red, brown, or black.

Lau pahudu are skirts worked with supplementary warp. Lau hada are skirts worked with beads and shells. They are also known as pakiri mbola, which means "at the bottom of the basket" and refers to the way they are carried when bought as a part of marriage gifts.

An Indonesian gallery, Threads of Life, has archived various images of these skirts.

== Tiara ==
Tiara are narrow textiles. The wider version, Tiara haringgi, is used as a shoulder cloth. A narrow version is used as a headband.

== See ==
- Balinese textiles
- Ikat
- Tapis
- Ulos
- Batik
- Songket
- National costume of Indonesia
- Indonesian art
