= Supplementary weaving =

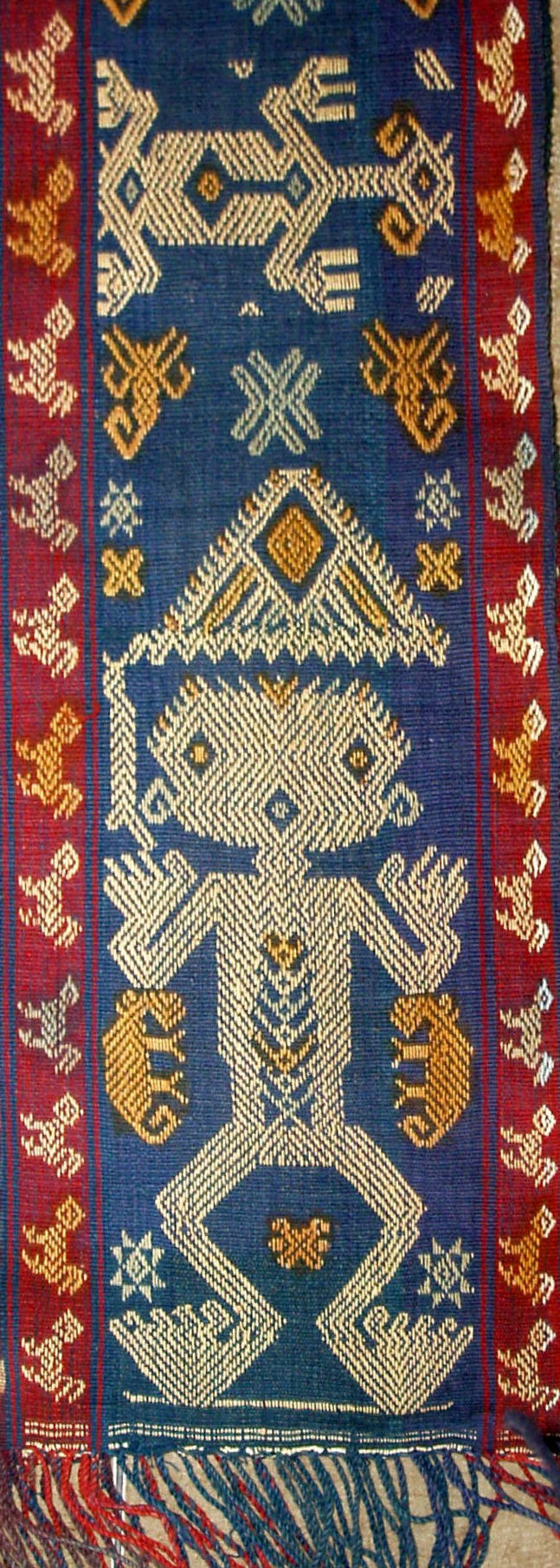
Front view of a detail from a textile from Sumba depicting an ancestor figure (Marapu) using a supplementary of the warp.

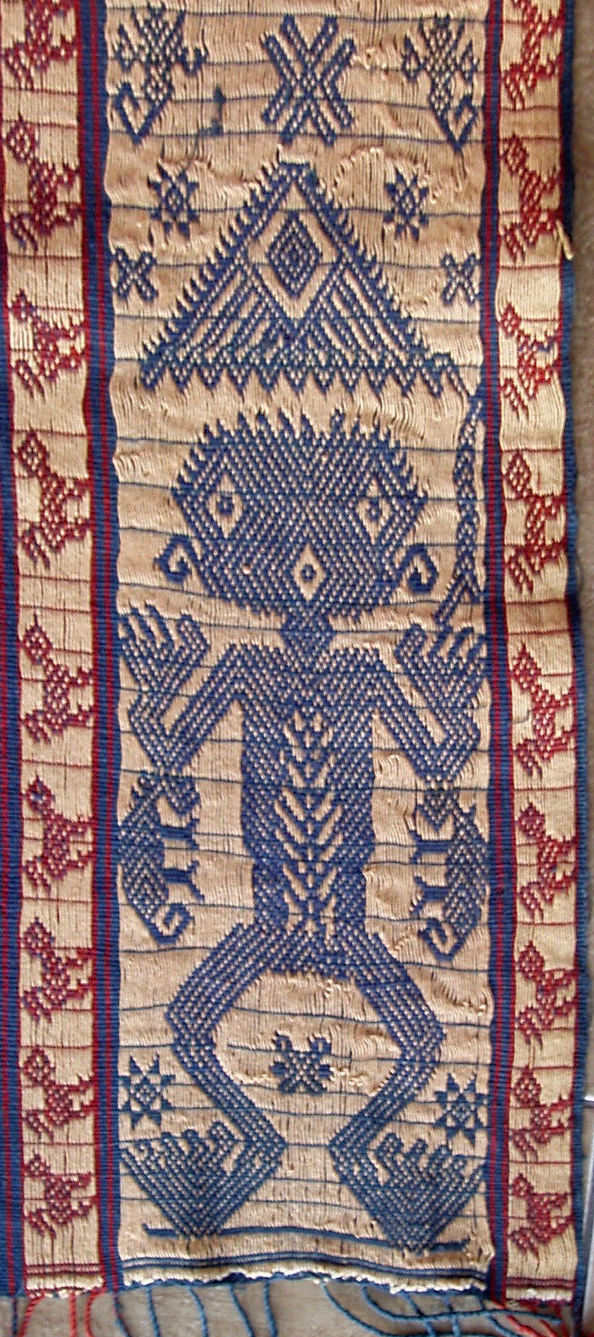
Back view of a detail from a textile from Sumba depicting an ancestor figure (Marapu) using a supplementary of the warp

Supplementary weaving is a decorative technique in which additional threads are woven into a textile to create an ornamental pattern in addition to the ground pattern. The supplementary weave can be of the warp or of the weft. Supplementary weave is commonly used in many of the textiles of Southeast Asia such as in Balinese textiles, the textiles of Sumba and the songket of Sumatra, Malaysia and Brunei.

== Supplementary of the warp weaving ==
An additional set of threads are incorporated in the warp to create the design.

== Supplementary of the weft weaving ==
An extra set of threads are woven into the weft between two regular weft threads to create an ornamental pattern in addition to the ground weave. Songket textiles are an example of supplementary weaving of the weft in which metallic threads are used to form the pattern.

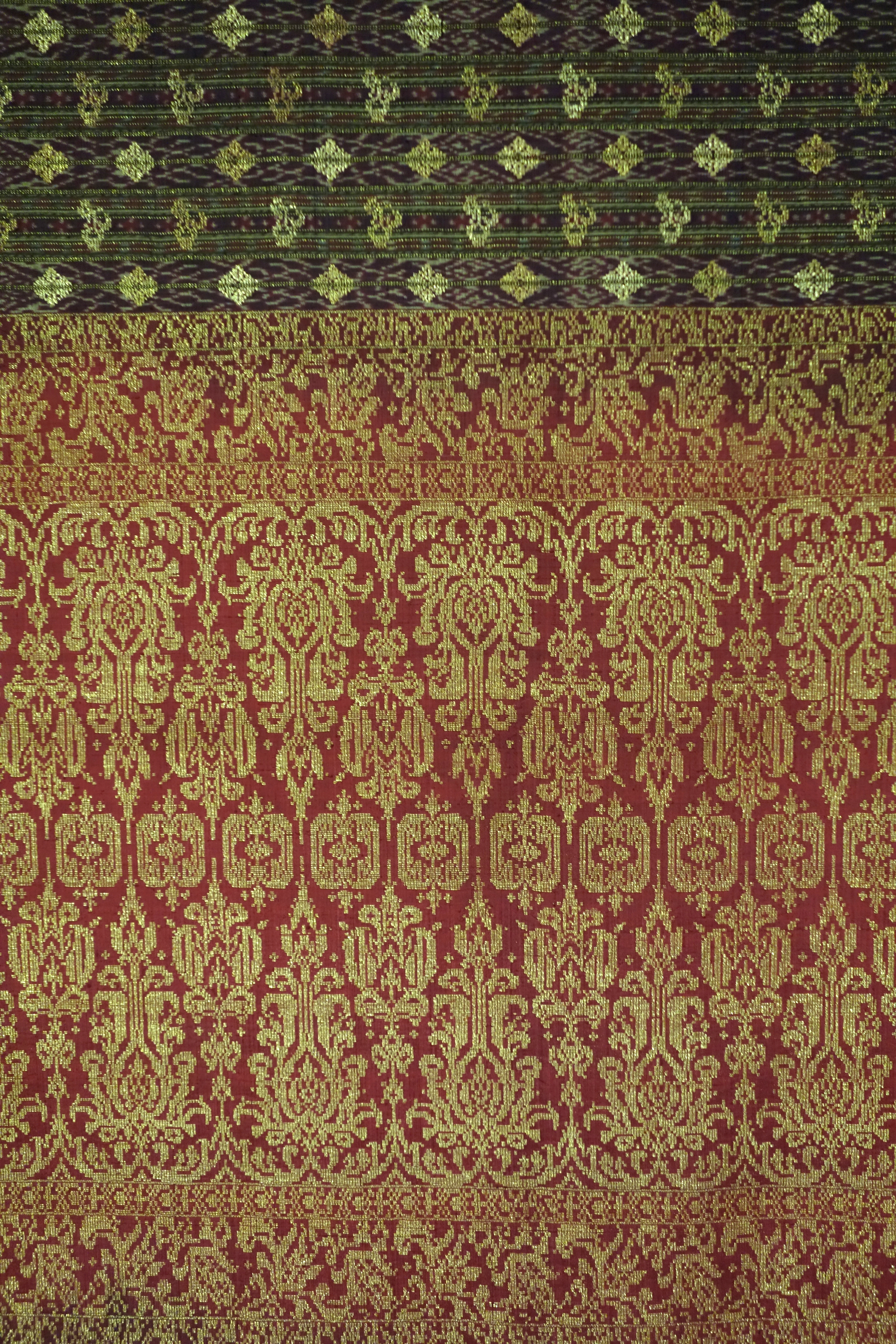
(Terengganu, Malaysia, Sarong, late 19th century, silk, gold thread - Textile Museum of Canada - DSC01006.JPG

== History ==
Evidence from certain important textiles displaying ancient iconography and significant in ritual, suggests that supplementary weft patterning techniques existed before the period of Indian influence in Southeast Asia. Nevertheless, there is no doubt that the earliest weaving decorations in the region were predominantly warp oriented. However a fundamental shift from warp to weft decoration seems to have occurred throughout many parts of Southeast Asia during the period of Indian influence. The development of weft ornamentation is evident in woven patterns found throughout Indianized areas. In Cambodia during the Angkor period and in Thailand from the 11th to the 14th century, carved statues and sculptures record figures wearing textiles with stripes running down the torso.
