= Balinese textiles =

Weaving styles of the Indonesian island of Bali

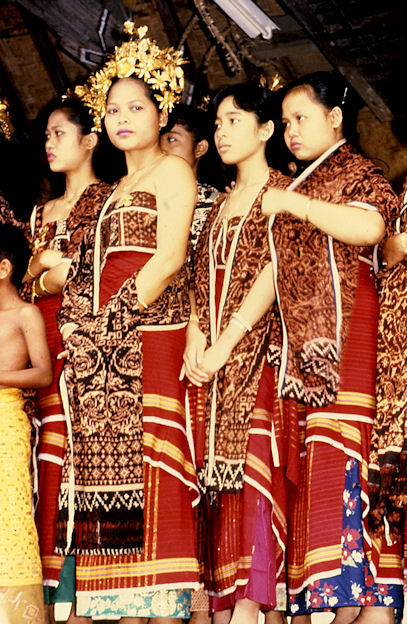
Balinese ladies wearing geringsing textile

Balinese textiles are reflective of the historical traditions of Bali, Indonesia. Bali has been historically linked to the major courts of Java before the 10th century; and following the defeat of the Majapahit kingdom, many of the Javanese aristocracy fled to Bali and the traditions were continued. Bali therefore may be seen as a repository not only of its own arts but those of Java in the pre-Islamic 15th century. Any attempt to definitively describe Balinese textiles and their use is doomed to be incomplete. The use of textile is a living tradition and so is in constant change. It will also vary from one district to another. For the most part old cloth (excepting the especially sacred) are not venerated for their age. New is much better. In the tropics cloth rapidly deteriorates and so virtue is generated by replacing them.

== Textile as a sign or symbol ==
In Bali, textiles are much more than just cloths from which garments are made. Beginning with the yarn and the woven cloth, they are a medium through which the divine nature of the universe and its material manifestations are recognized and expressed. Cloth is central to all Balinese spiritual activities. In every Balinese Hindu household, every day a family member will make offerings to the gods. To do this she (it usually is she) must at a minimum wear a sash around her waist. Trees and significant rocks are wrapped in the black and white poleng. When the men of the village banjar gather for a working bee in the temple they wear a sarong and sash. The more important the event (and the Balinese calendar is full of important days), the more formal and complex is the dress.

== Polèng ==
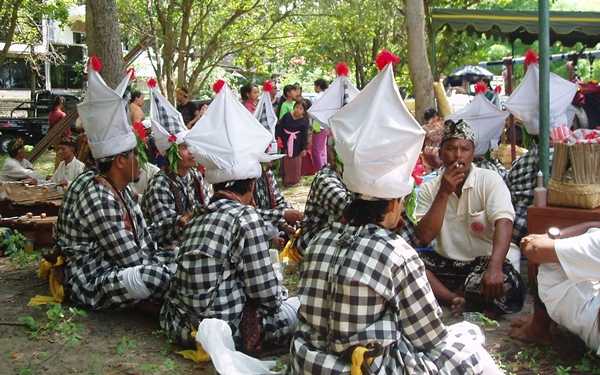
A Baris polèng dancers resting before a performance, Kuta 2009

Polĺèng cloth are the black and white checkered pattern seen almost everywhere. Polèng refers to the black and white squares and not the material from which it is made or if it is woven or printed. Most of the printed cloth comes from Java, but there are still weavers in Bali who produce hand woven polèng for special applications.

A frequent use of Polèng is as a wrapper for sacred trees, rocks, and shrines.

== Endek ==
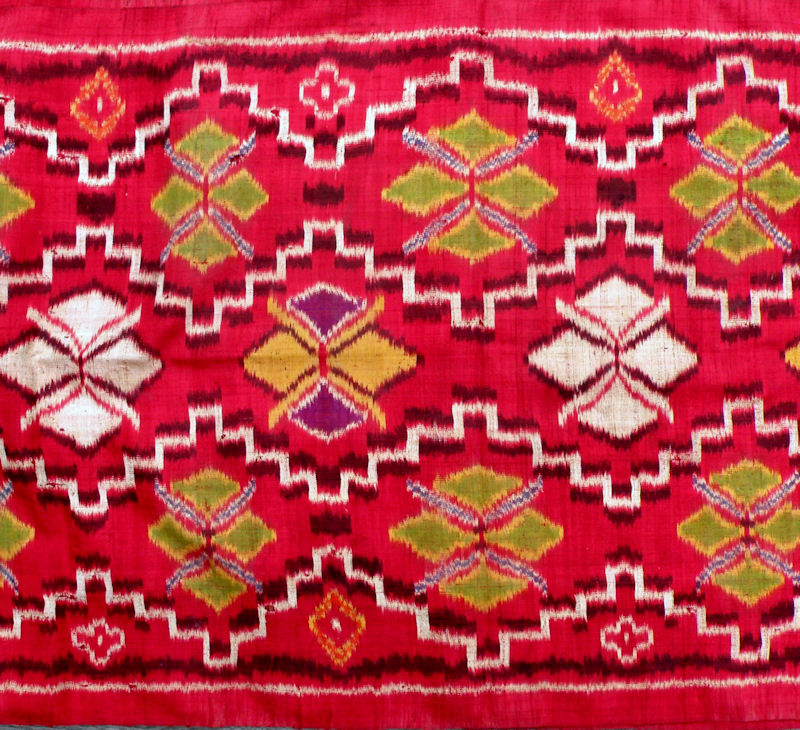
Old silk Endek from Singaraja, early 20th century tumpak bela design

The patterning technique of endek is ikat of the weft. Once solely the prerogative of high caste Balinese families, endek was woven as individual pieces on a back strap loom but now is produced in large quantities by the yard in workshops in Gianyar, Denpasar, Tabanan and other places on ATBM looms (alat tenun bukan mesin or unmechanized looms).

The earliest extant endek date from the late 19th century and come from the North Balinese Kingdom of Buleleng and are predominantly of geometric design. The color of these early cloths are red. These usually had songket ends. Only later do yellows and green appear and the songket was omitted.

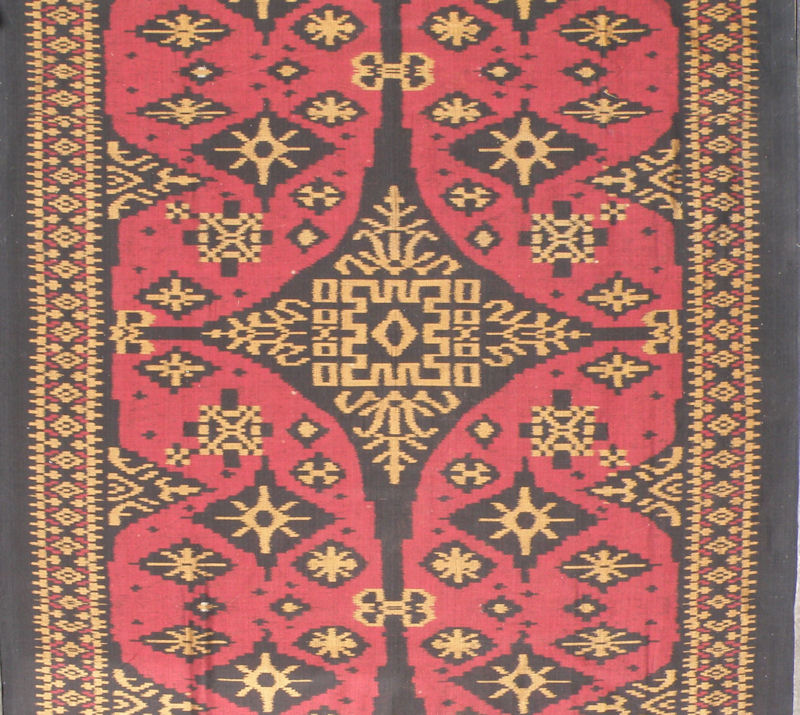
Modern ikat of the warp creating a geringsing pattern. Central Bali

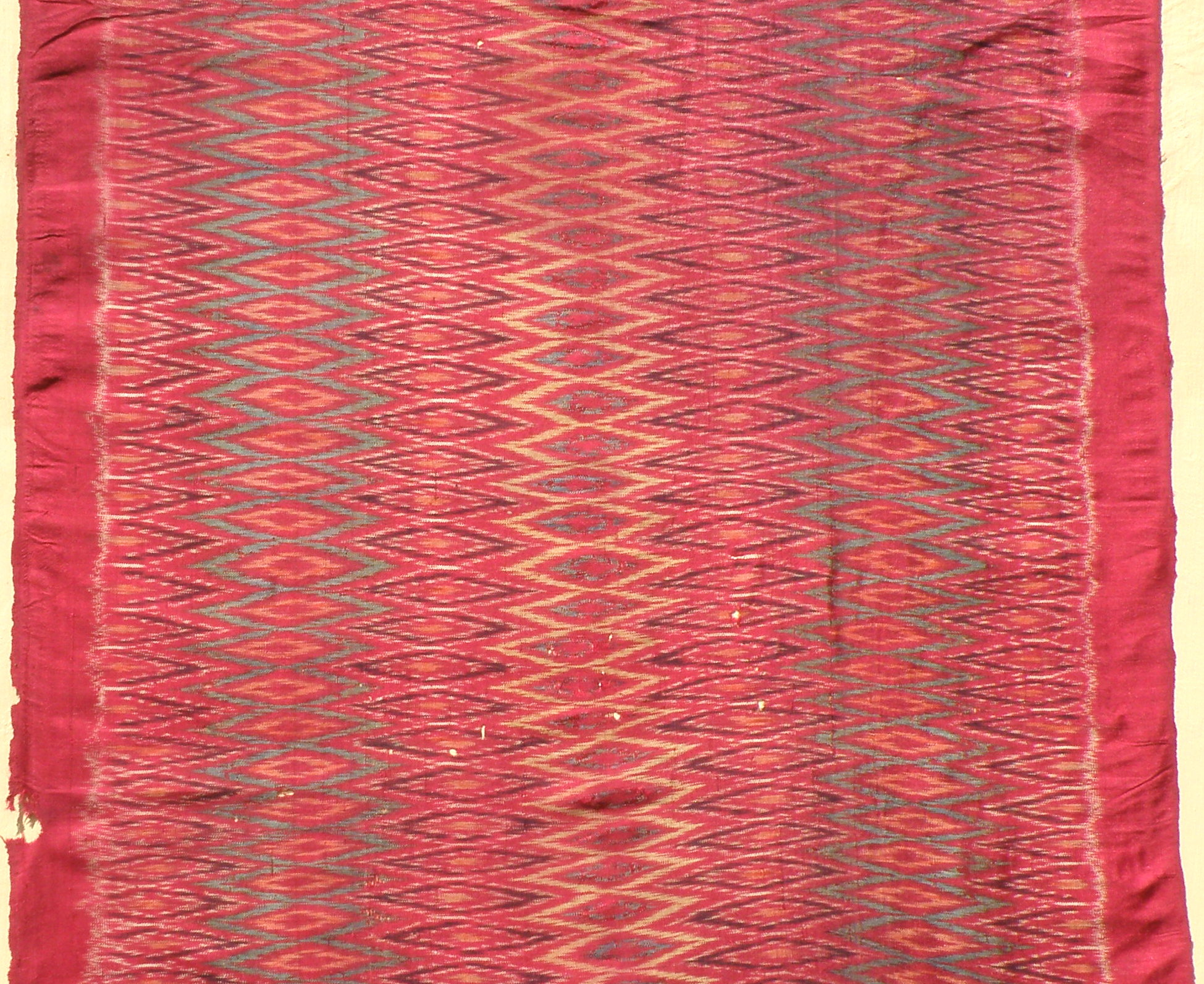
Early Singaraja silk endek

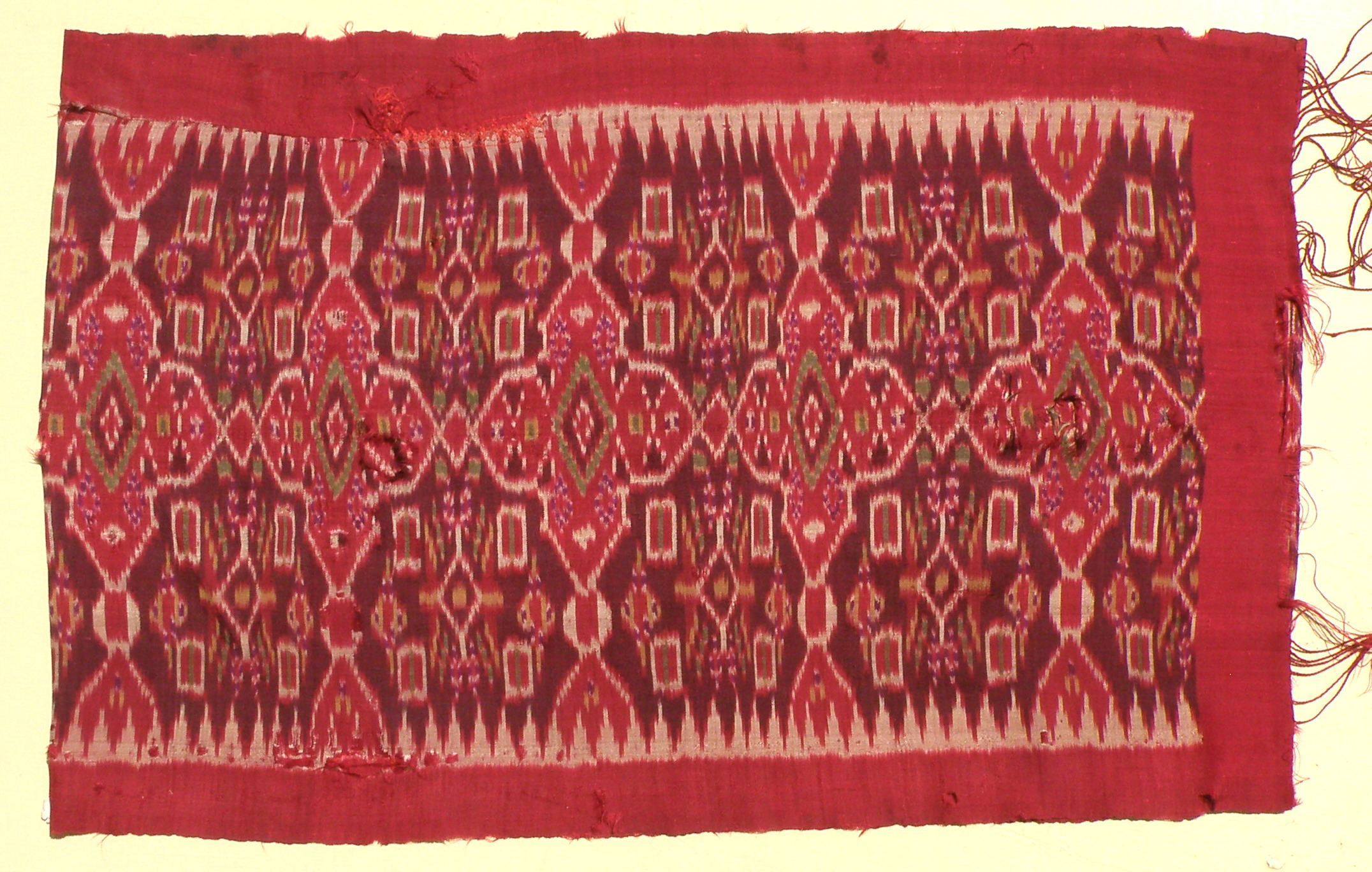
Late 19th-century Singaraja silk endek

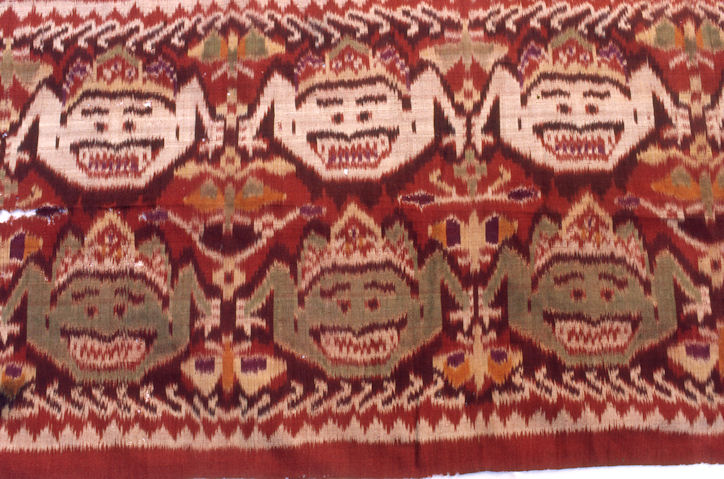
Detail of an old Buleleng silk selendang

== Keling ==
Keling are cloths traditionally woven in stripes of red, yellow, dark blue or black from hand spun cotton dyed with natural dyes obtained from the roots of the sunti for the reds, and the fruit of the kunti for the yellows. In earlier times most of the women of Nusa Penida wore keling underskirts described by Claire Holt in the 1930s. She described multicolored striped cloth worn under the dark blue upper kain in such a way that only a small part showed. The name is thought by some to be derived from the Balinese word keling which refers to Indian merchant. The roots may be related to an older legend concerning the primal ancestors of the village Tenganan, the king Kaung and his wife Keling. This is supported by the observation that the cloths are traditionally worn by women.

Ritual uses of keling include in the otonin 6 month ceremony for a child, in ceremonies to keep away evil spirits and in other rites of passage.

== Bebali ==
Bebali is the name usually ascribed to a small group of textiles that appear to have been completely sacred in function. The weave is broadly spaced giving the textile a delicate gauze like quality. According to Gittinger in 1970, what is known about them comes entirely from records in the Museum für Volkskunde in Basel, however bebali textiles can be bought today in the Kumba Sari market in Denpasar. Hauser-Schaubilin states that there are at least nine differently patterned bebali cloths, each with its own name. There is, for example, cloth with a white warp and weft broken by green, yellow and red stripes known as cenana kawi whose function is in the 3 month ritual and also are laid out in the central shrine of an ancestral temple. Bias membah (running sand) has a white warp and weft in which grey and white stripes alternate. Enkakan taluh (smashed egg) has a vivid red-and white checked pattern. It is brought to the temple as an apparel for Brahma, the god residing in the south. Two examples of bebali cloth are firstly flat cloth, for example, Kain cepuk, Kain Songket, Kain Sekordi. Secondly round cloth, where the cloth is removed from the loom and the threads not cut leaving a seamless cloth sheet., In the north and south of Bali known as Kain Wangsul meaning "to go round" or "to return". In the east of Bali, especially Klungkung and Karangasem, they are called Gedogan or "circle", the circle represents zero. Ida Ayu Ngurah Puniari (Ibu Dayu) writes that the Gedogan or Wangsul is not symmetrical, this represents purusa and predana, (male and female) where the left and right hand sides will not line up, when warping on the loom a few extra threads are added so one side is uneven. These bebali cloths are now being made with natural dyes and manufactured cottons in the traditional manner with a quality that is comparable with the earlier collected pieces of the 1920s.

== Cepuk ==
Kamben cepuk is an ikat of the weft from the island of Nusa Penida. These textiles were used as special ceremonial clothing in the past but now more commonly serve as temple decoration.

== Geringsing ==
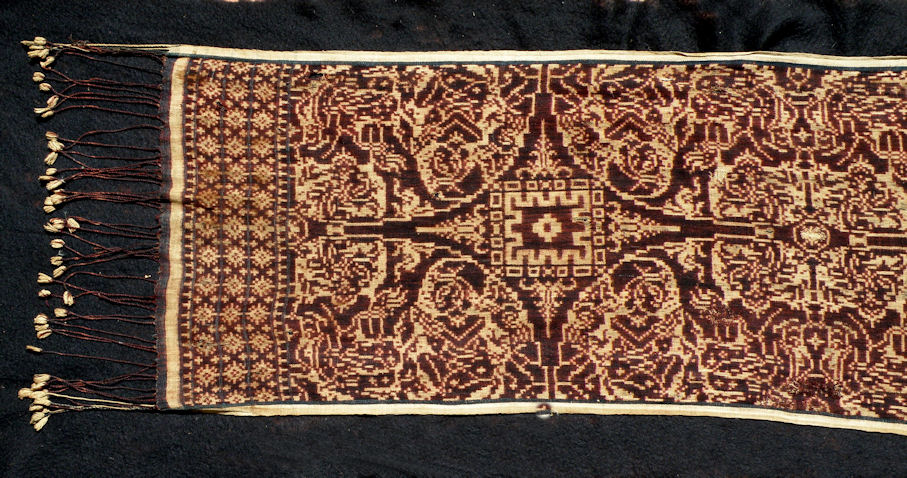
Geringsing Wayang Putri

Geringsing is the name of the double ikat cloth that is woven in the village of Tenganan Pegringsinga. About 20 patterns of geringsing are known and the dimensions of the cloths range from 20 cm to 60 cm wide and can be over 2 meter long. The palette of geringsing is typically red, neutral, and black. Geringsing are regarded as sacred cloths, "ascribed supernatural properties, especially to assist in forms of healing, including exorcism." It is mentioned in the poem Rangga Lawe which tells of the first Majapahit king, Raden Wijaya giving his warriors geringsing sashes to protect them in Battle. The first European to describe geringseng was W.O.J Nieuwenkamp; he discovered where they came from and made a journey to Tenganan.

The weaving technique is the dying of the thread is complex and ritualized, as described in the page on geringsing. Once dyed, the warp is laid out on the loom and the cloth is woven in a loose balanced weave. The pattern is carried by both the warp and the weft. Great precision is needed at all stages of the production. Using a pick the weaver adjust the weft with each pass of the shuttle to make sure the alignment of the pattern is precise.

== Ider-ider ==
Ider-ider are a length of cloth onto which a story, often from the Ramayana or Mahabharata has been embroidered. These are used as a valance for a temple or a balé. All forms of textile techniques can be used including chain stitching, applique, sequins.

== Lamak ==
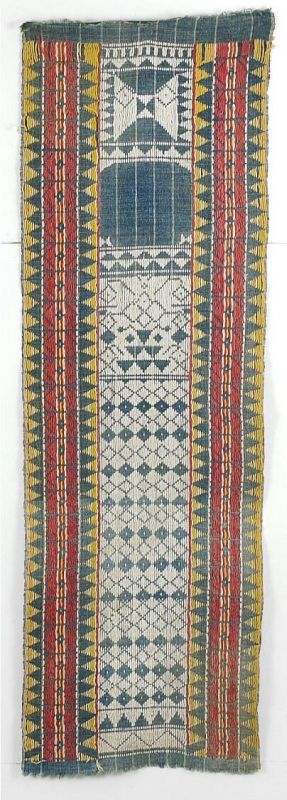
Lamak. Tropenmuseum, TMnr 5977-40

Lamak are long banners that are hung from penjor at the festival of galungan and in front of temples and shrines at other important festivals. The design of lamak generally has a stylized 'cili' figure at the top, represented by a triangular skirt, followed by a long pattered fields, ending in a row of tumpal The cili is often associated with Dewi Sri, the deity of fertility and prosperity. Despite her feminine form the figure should be understood as a symbol of both men and women. In most cases they are made from cross cut and applied palm leaf and therefore are quite perishable. Only occasionally are they made from cotton woven in a supplementary weave. In the western and northern parts of Bali, lamak are made of cloth and all textile techniques can be found from weaving, embroidery and appliqué.

== Prada ==
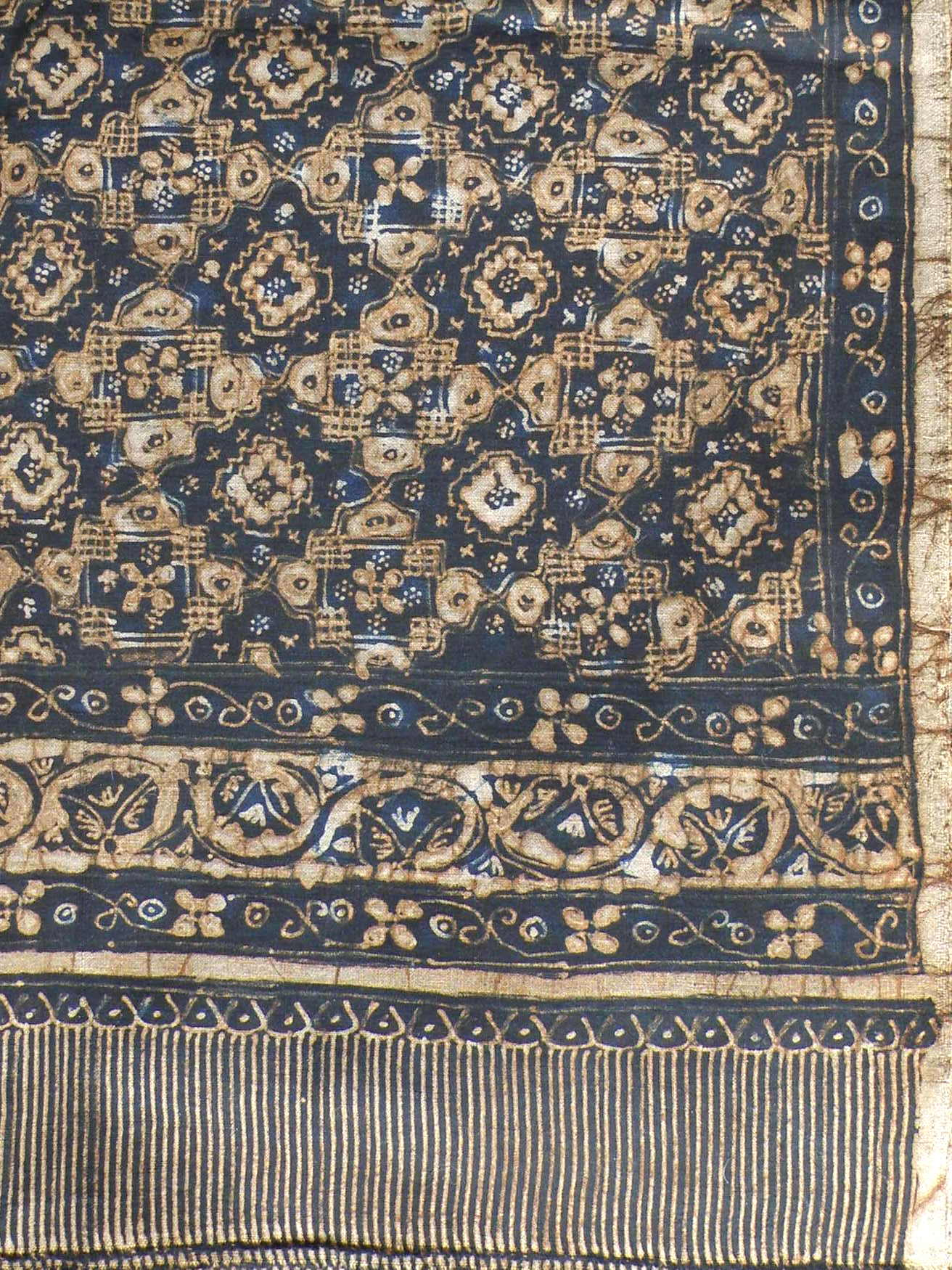
Old perada Kain panjang. The gold almost completely lost.

In Bali, prada (also sometimes called perada) is the name given to the technique of decorating a cloth with gold dust or gold leaf. Prada is not exclusively a Balinese textile. Old javanese sources suggest that it was popular in the aristocratic circles of the East Javanese kingdom of Majapahit.

Batik from Java was once commonly the base material but now a brightly colored commercial cloth is usually used. In the past a whitish glue (ancur) obtained from fish bones, or a darker glue made from water buffalo skin was applied and the gold then applied. Real gold prada is almost never seen today. It has been replaced by cloth printed with a gold paint or a plastic foil.

Prada is now used in almost every ceremonial function. It is used to decorate ceremonial umbrellas for processions, it wraps temples, decorates the penjor ceremonial flags, is used in dancer's costumes and almost anywhere that some glitter is required.

== Songkèt ==
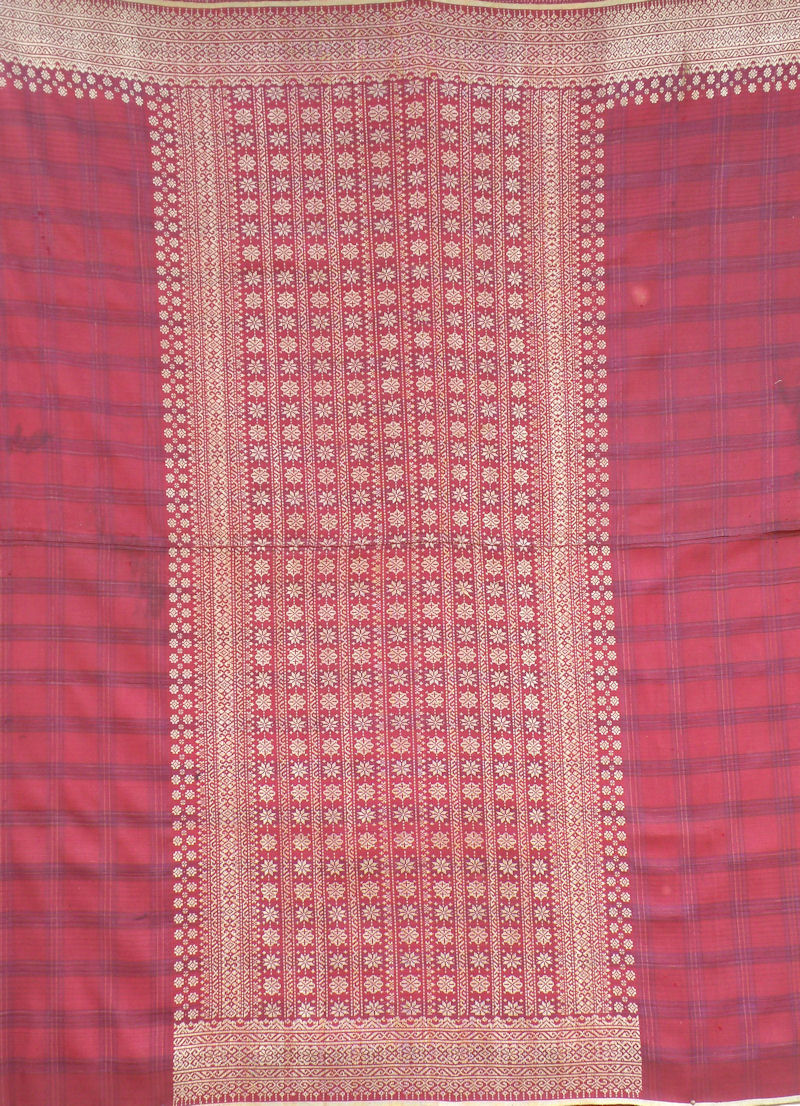
Silk Singaraja songket sarong.

Songkèt is the technique in which a supplementary weave of the weft is used to create the pattern. The early songkèt were entirely of silk with a supplementary weft of gold thread. Today mixed cloths are seen with cotton, gimp golden and silver threads, viscose and artificial silk. Originally the preserve of the highest castes, with the democratization of Balinese society anyone who can afford to buy them is now able to do so. Thus songkèt has become an integral part of the ceremonial wardrobe of well-to-do Balinese.

Both men and women wear full-body songket wraps for some of life's most important moments. At a Balinese wedding, the bride and groom wear a pair of matching songket. The Balinese also wear songket when their teeth are filed in a ceremony called metatah.

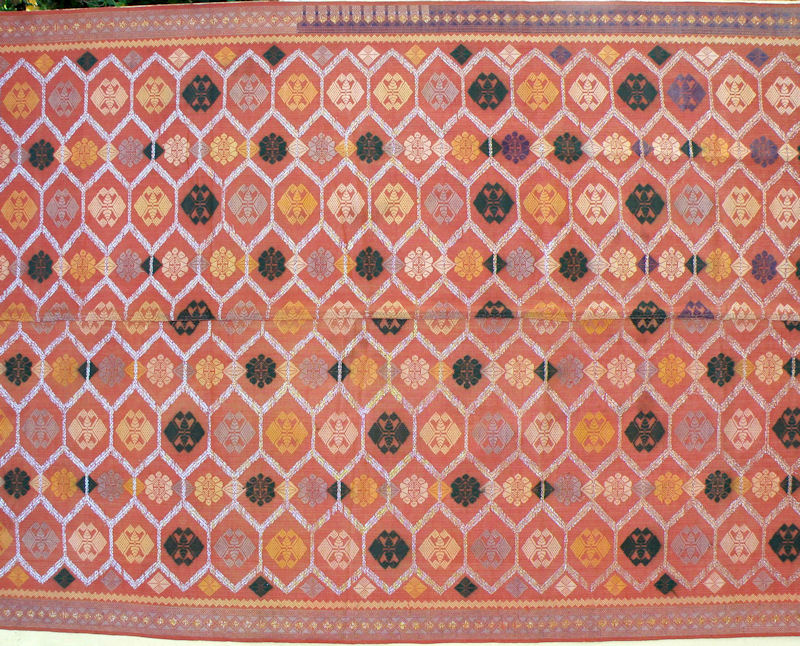
Detail of songket sarong. Woven on a narrow back-strap loom and then joined

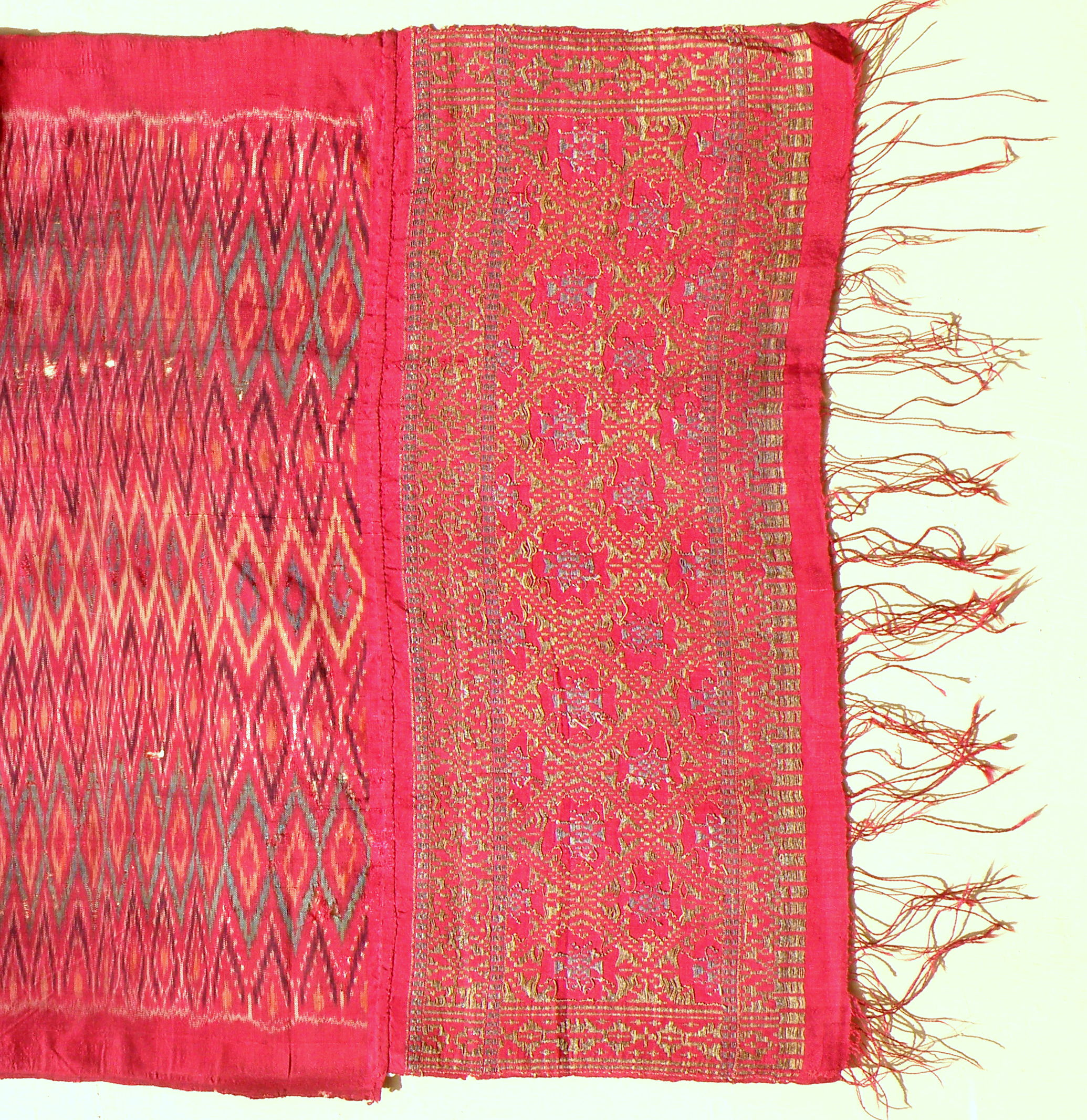
Songket end to a Singaraja silk selendang. Very old and somewhat worn

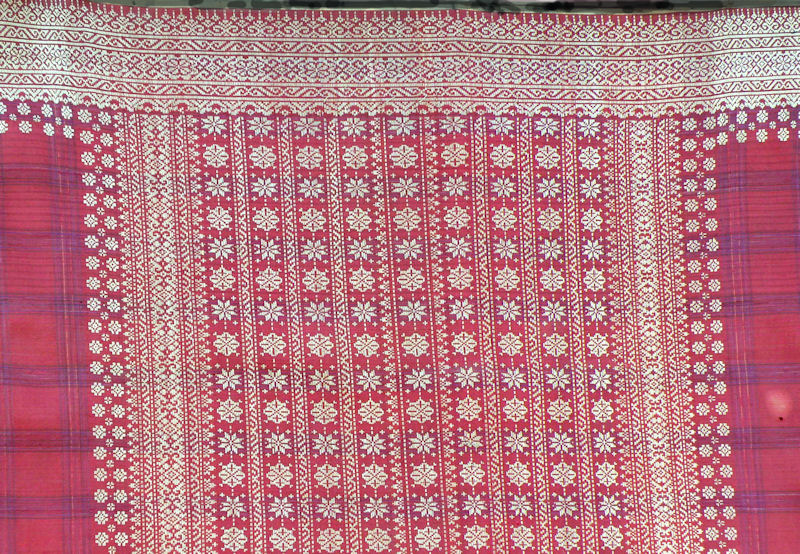
Detail of old Singaraja songket panel

== See also ==
- Batik
- Textiles of Sumba
- National costume of Indonesia
- Indonesian art
