= Songket =

Traditional Maritime Southeast Asian woven fabric

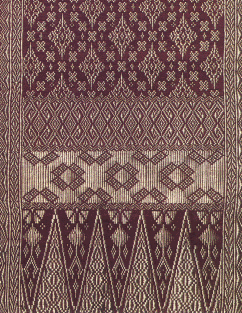
- A typical Minangkabau songket, the pattern in the lower third representing bamboo sprouts
- Type: Art fabric
- Material: Silk, cotton, gold, silver
- Place of origin: Palembang, Sumatra (present-day Indonesia, mainly and originally), spread throughout Maritime Southeast Asia

Songket
- UNESCO Intangible Cultural Heritage
- Country: Malaysia
- Domains: Traditional craftsmanship
- Reference: 01505
- Region: Asia and the Pacific

Inscription history
- Inscription: 2021 (16th session)
- List: Representative List

Songket or sungkit is a tenun fabric that belongs to the brocade family of textiles of Brunei, Indonesia, and Malaysia. It is hand-woven in silk or cotton, and intricately patterned with gold or silver threads. The metallic threads stand out against the background cloth to create a shimmering effect. In the weaving process the metallic threads are inserted in between the silk or cotton weft (latitudinal) threads in a technique called supplementary weft weaving technique.

Songket is often associated with the Srivijaya Empire as the origin of the songket tradition, several types of popular Songket can not be separated from locations that were once under Srivijaya rule, one of the dominant locations which is also believed to be the capital of the Srivijaya Empire in the past, namely Palembang, which located in South Sumatra, Indonesia. Besides Palembang, several areas in Sumatra are also the best-in-class Songket producing locations, which include areas in Minangkabau or West Sumatra such as Pandai Sikek, Silungkang, Koto Gadang, and Padang. Outside of Sumatra, songket is also produced by regions such as Bali, Lombok, Sambas, Sumbawa, Makassar, Sulawesi, and other areas in Indonesia.

Due to the historical factors of the Srivijaya Empire, trade, and mixed marriages, Songket has also become popular in the Maritime Southeast Asia region, especially in countries around Indonesia such as Brunei, Malaysia, and Singapore.

Based on the analysis conducted on the statues at the Bumiayu temple, South Sumatra, it can be seen that songket has been worn by the people of South Sumatra since the 8th century CE, when Srivijaya was based in Palembang. This statue was found at the Bumiayu Temple Archaeological Site which is located on the downstream bank of Lematang River which empties into Musi River, precisely in Tanah Abang District, Penukal Abab Lematang Ilir Regency approximately 120 km to the west of Palembang City.

In Malaysia, songket was recognised as intangible national heritage by the Malaysian Ministry of Tourism, Arts, and Culture in 2012. In Indonesia, five songket traditions are recognised as Intangible Cultural Heritage by the Indonesian Ministry of Education and Culture. They are songket traditions of Palembang and Sambas, both appointed in 2013; Pandai Sikek songket of West Sumatra, appointed in 2014; songket tradition of Beratan, Bali appointed in 2018; and Silungkang songket tradition of West Sumatra, appointed in 2019. In 2021, UNESCO (United Nations Educational, Scientific and Cultural Organization) officially recognized Songket as a Masterpiece of the Oral and Intangible Heritage of Humanity from Malaysia.

== Etymology ==
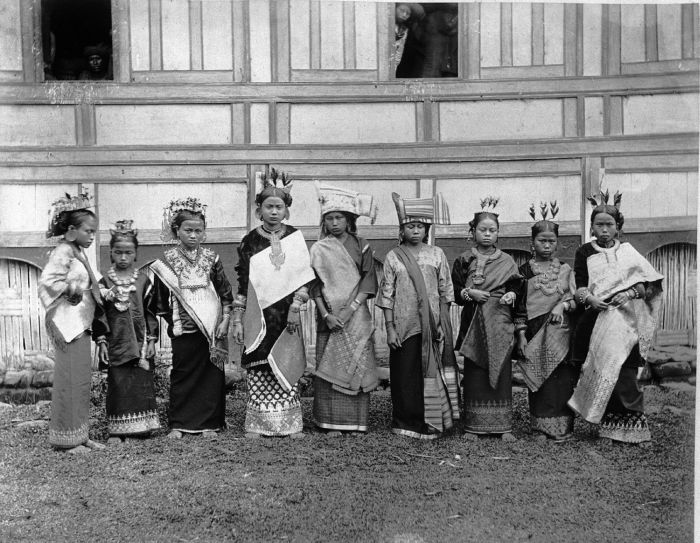
A group of women dressed in indigenous clothing songket from Batipuh near Padang Panjang highlands of West Sumatra, circa 1895

The term songket derived from the Malay word of sungkit, which means "to hook". It is referred to the method of songket making; to hook and pick a group of threads, and then slip the gold and silver threads in it. Another theory suggested that it was constructed from the combination of two terms, tusuk (prick) and cukit (pick), that combined as sukit, modified further as sukit and finally songket.

The Malay word menyongket means ‘to embroider with gold or silver threads’. Songket is a luxury product traditionally worn during ceremonial occasions as sarong, shoulder cloths or head ties and tanjak, a headdress songket. Songket were worn at the courts of Kingdoms in Sumatra especially the Srivijaya, as the source and the origin of Malay culture in Southeast Asia. In the early kingdom age, Songkets are also traditionally worn as an apparel by the Malay royal families in Sumatra such as the Deli Sultanate in Medan, Serdang Sultanate, Palembang Sultanate in Palembang and the recently restored royal house in Jambi and sultanates in Malay Peninsula such as Pattani, Kelantan and Terengganu. The fabric is even mandated as part of the ceremonial court dress of Bruneian royalty since the time of Omar Ali Saifuddien III. Traditionally women are the weavers of songket, however in this modern time men also are known to weave it as well.

Songket is known in many names in vernacular Indonesian languages. Other than in Sumatra and Malay peninsula, it is also commonly known as songket/tenun cag cag in Bali. While it is known as songke in Manggarai, Flores, and Bima in Sumbawa. The Karo Batak of North Sumatra, call it jongkit. People in Ternate, Maluku, call it suje, while the Buginese in South Sulawesi call it subbi’ and arekare’ and the Iban Dayak in West Kalimantan and Sarawak call it pilih or pileh.

== History ==
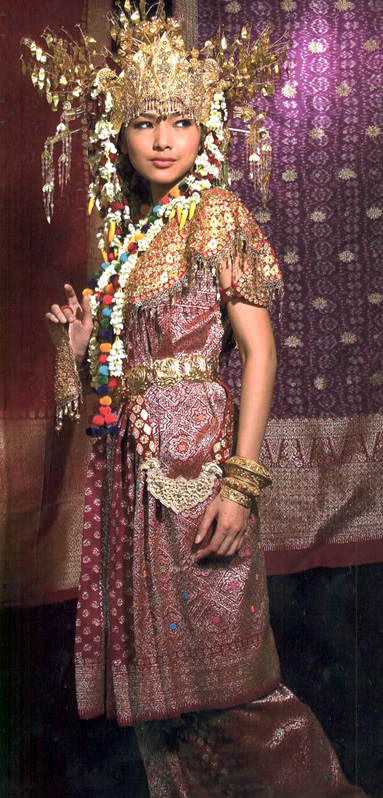
Songket in Palembang Aesan Gede wedding costume, South Sumatra

Songket weaving traditions at first, historically associated with Srivijaya empire, a wealthy 7th to 13th-century maritime trading empire based on Sumatra. Palembang and Minangkabau Pandai Sikek area are the best and the most famous songket producers in Indonesia. According to a Palembang folk tradition that has been narrated for generations, the origin of songket came from the Chinese traders who brought silk threads, while the Indian or Middle Eastern traders brought gold threads. Subsequently, the woven combination has become the exquisitely shimmering golden songket. It associated with areas of Malay settlement in Sumatra, and the production techniques could have been introduced by Indian or Arab merchants.

Songket is a luxurious textile that required some amount of real gold leaves and gold threads to be hand-woven into exquisite fabrics, surely it has become a symbol of luxury and social status. Historically the gold mines are located in Sumatra hinterland; Jambi and Minangkabau Highlands. Although gold threads were found buried in the Srivijaya ruins in Sumatra, along with unpolished rubies and pieces of gold plate, there is no corroborating evidence that the local weavers used gold threads as early as 7th century to early 8th century.

Based on archaeological data, it can be seen that songket has been known by the people of South Sumatra between the 8th to the 9th century CE, as seen in ancient statues cloths motifs from the site of the Bumiayu temple complex in Penukal Abab Lematang Ilir Regency, South Sumatra Province, Indonesia. At that time the use of songket was reserved only for the nobility, as seen from the statues which were probably the deified personification of a king. The evidence for the existence of songket can be seen on the lepus motifs found on the vest worn by Figure 1 at the Bumiayu temple complex. The use of lepus motif shows the continuity of that motif that has been around since the 9th century.

The description of textiles reminiscent of songket can be found in 10th century Chinese source from Song dynasty. According to this Song chronicle, in 992 the envoy from She-po (Java) arrived in Chinese court bearing a lot of gifts, consists of silk "woven with floral motifs made of gold threads", ivories, pearls, silk of various colours, fragrant sandalwood, cotton clothes of various colours, turtle shells, betel nut preparation kit, kris dagger with exquisite hilt made of rhino horn and gold, rattan mat with the image of white cockatoo, and a small model of house made of sandalwood adorned with valuable ornaments.

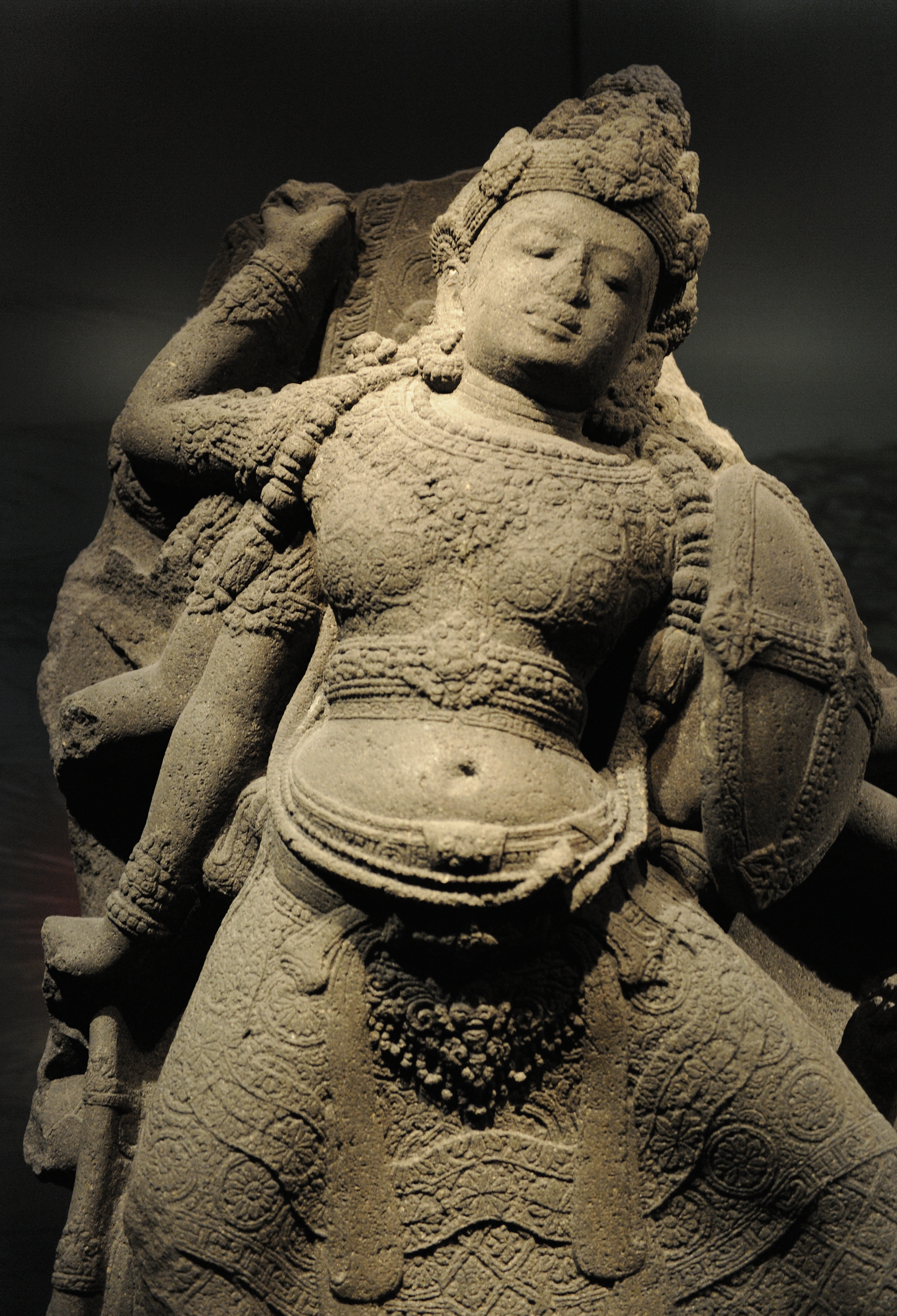
The statue of Durga Mahisasuramardini from 13th century Singhasari temple shows the sash is carved with "star flower" motifs, a pattern that continues today in songket design

Studies of Javanese statues dated from Indonesian Hindu-Buddhist period between 8th to 15th centuries provides a glimpse of the fashion during that period. These statues were decorated elaborately including textiles pattern. The details of kain lower garment of Durga Mahisasuramardini form the 13th-century Singhasari temple near Malang, shows elaborately carved tassels which suggests goldwork decoration. The costume is completed with two sashes draped over the legs carved with bunga bintang or "star flower" motifs, a pattern that continues today in songket design. The precision of stone carved textile suggests the designs are unlikely an invention of sculptor's imagination, and more likely to have replicated a cloth that existed at the time.

Various Chinese and Arab accounts mentioned the presence of textiles produced within the region and emphasized the prevalence of weaving in the Malay Peninsula. According to Kelantan tradition this weaving technique came from the north, somewhere in the Cambodia-Siam region and expanded south into Pattani, and finally reach the Malay court of Kelantan and Terengganu as early as the 16th century. The weaving of songket continues as a small cottage industry on the outskirts of Kota Bharu and Terengganu. However, Terengganu weavers believe that songket weaving technique was introduced to Malaysia from India through Sumatra's Palembang and Jambi where it probably originated during the time of Srivijaya (7th to 11th century). Nevertheless, Zani Bin Ismail put forth the argument that the origins of songket can be traced to China and subsequently spread to Indochina, including Cambodia and Thailand. His assertion was based on the similarities observed in the handweaving looms of Terengganu, Cambodia, and Thailand.

Another possible of origin of songket based on Liang dynasty record (502-557) is from Langkasuka kingdom, an ancient kingdom dressed in the Malay Peninsula. It's King dressed ‘rose-colored cloth with gold flowers’, which could have been a songket of some kind, as red is traditional color of Songket.

Much documentation is sketchy about the origins of the songket but it is most likely that songket weaving was brought to Peninsular Malaysia through intermarriages between royal families. This was a common occurrence in the 15th century for sealing strategic alliances. Production was located in politically significant kingdoms because of the high cost of materials; the gold thread used was originally wound with real gold leaf.

The use of songket vest with lepus motif as described in the statue of the Bumiayu temple, was also popular during the Islamic Palembang Sultanate period from the 16th to 19th centuries, and limited only for the upper class of the society. After the collapse of the sultanate, songket began to spread among non-aristocrats.

Songket as king's dress was also mentioned by Abdullah bin Abdul Kadir writings in 1849.

== Tradition ==
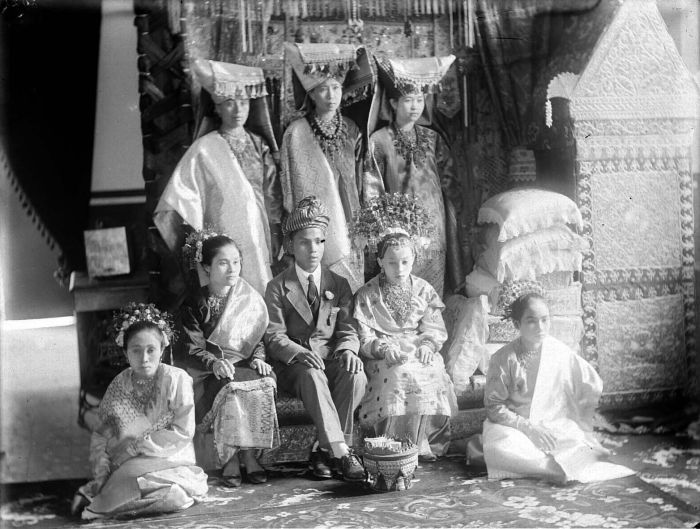
Minangkabau wedding ceremony using songket Minangkabau cloth in Padang Panjang, West Sumatra, late 19th century

Songket is traditionally considered an exquisite, luxurious and prestigious traditional fabric, only worn for special occasions, religious festivals, and traditional social functions. It has become a required garment for brides and grooms for their weddings, as in the traditional wedding costumes of Palembangese, Minangkabau and Balinese people.

In Indonesian tradition, songket has become a marker of social status. Traditionally a certain songket motif is reserved for particular social status. For example in Palembang songket tradition, the lepus motifs were originally reserved only for bangsawan (royalty, nobles or aristocrats). Songket is indeed employed as a social marker of the wearer, even as far as to inform the marital status of the wearer. In old Palembang, widows wore outstanding selendang (shoulder cloth) songket to disclose their social and marital status. There are two kinds of specific songket motifs for widows; those for widows eligible for remarriage is called songket janda berias (dress up widow songket), and those for widow brides is called songket janda pengantin (widow bride songket).

Today, songket are usually made from affordable materials, such as using artificial gold threads made of nylon instead of pure gold threads. Nevertheless, there are few rare songket actually made from real gold threads. These are precious textiles that are held as pusaka or heirloom passed down for generations within a family.

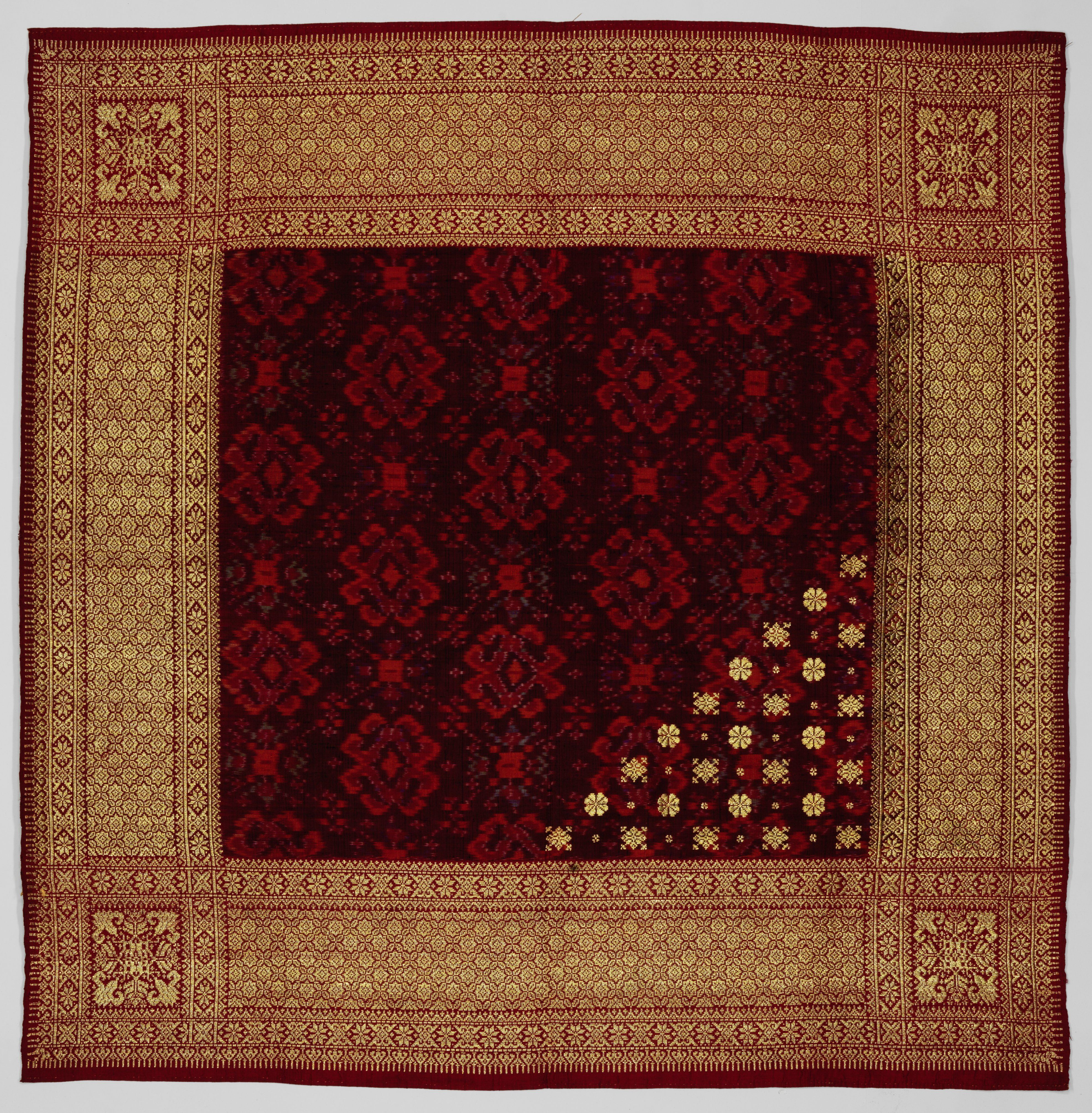
Setangan headscarf, south Sumatra, c. 1900. Rijksmuseum Amsterdam

Today, songket is mostly worn in traditional settings as traditional costumes for weddings or any traditional ceremonies. Several efforts have been conducted to promote songket as a popular fabric for fashion locally and abroad. During the Dutch colonial era, West Sumatran songket were exhibited in the Netherlands. The Sawahlunto Songket Carnival was held in Sawahlunto, West Sumatra in August 2015. The songket carnival featured a parade and exhibition with participants from numbers of songket studios across West Sumatra. The carnival, held on 28 August 2015, was recorded in the Indonesian Museum of Records for the most people wearing songket at a same time, with 17,290 people wearing Silungkang songket during the event.

Several exhibitions have been held to preserve and promote the traditional art of songket making, such as the songket exhibition held in 2015 by Jakarta Textile Museum, which showcased around 100 pieces of songket from various Indonesian provinces.

Today, songket has become a source of inspiration for contemporary fashion designers who draw ideas from this traditional art.

=== Songket Minangkabau ===
Songket Minangkabau is a traditional songket woven cloth from West Sumatra that is an important part of cultural identity in the Minangkabau tradition. Songket is closely related to the Minangkabau community because it has been widely used as a material for traditional clothing and other traditional core crafts. There are various types of Minangkabau songket motifs and philosophies, each motif passed down from generation to generation for use in the Pepatih custom.

The history of the Songket Minangkabau itself comes from the Srivijaya which was then developed through the Sumatran kingdom until it finally entered the Minang realm. Songket was created as a means of expression because the Minang people in ancient times could not write, so they expressed their feelings through songket so that each had a different meaning.

As a characteristic of cloth in Minangkabau, the famous songket cloth in West Sumatra is Songket Pandai Sike and Songket Silungkang. The names of the two songket are taken from the name of the place where they from, namely Pandai Sikek in Tanah Datar and Silungkang in Sawahlunto.

Songket Minangkabau is a unique traditional art form. This weaving art is quite complicated and requires precision and perseverance in the weaving process. In addition, the ornaments or motifs of Minangkabau songket are not just decorations or ornaments. Minangkabau songket motifs or decorations each have a name and meaning, namely about the journey of Minangkabau culture and society. Songket Minangkabau motifs are displayed in the form of natural symbols, especially plants, which are rich in explicit and implied meanings. Songket motifs are often named after plants, animals or objects in the natural environment. For example, Bungo Malur, Kudo-Kudo, Balapak Gadang, Ranggo Patai Pucuak, Pucuak, Pucuak kelapa, and many more. The decorative motifs on the edge of the songket cloth are also named, such as Bungo Tanjung, Lintahu Ayahah, Bareh Diatua, Ula Gerang, and others. Like the motifs of Batik which are full of meaning, the Silungkang songket motifs are also studded with philosophy.

The motif of Kaluak Paku (the curve of a young fern shoot) means "Before correcting others, we should look inside ourselves first", while the Ilalang Rabah motif (falling down) means "Vigilance, prudence and accuracy of a leader are the main things".

The most popular and sacred motif for the Minangkabau community is the Pucuk Rebung motif or in the local language called Pucuak Rabuang, symbolizing a useful life throughout. It appears through the evolution of bamboo shoots (Bambu muda) to maturity, which reflects the human life progressing toward usefulness.

== Songket making ==
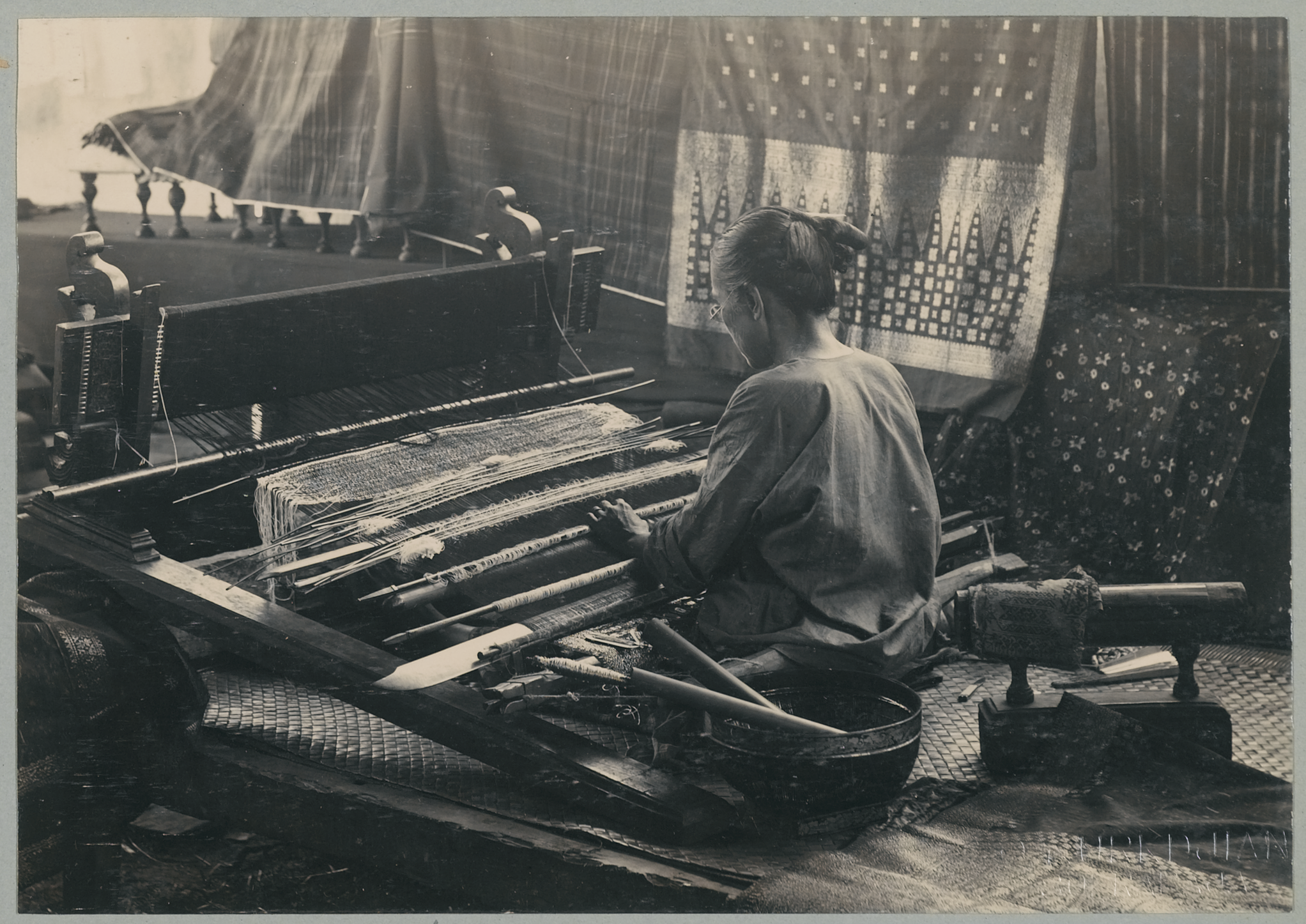
Songket making demonstration in Pasar Malam Surabaya circa 1905, Dutch East Indies

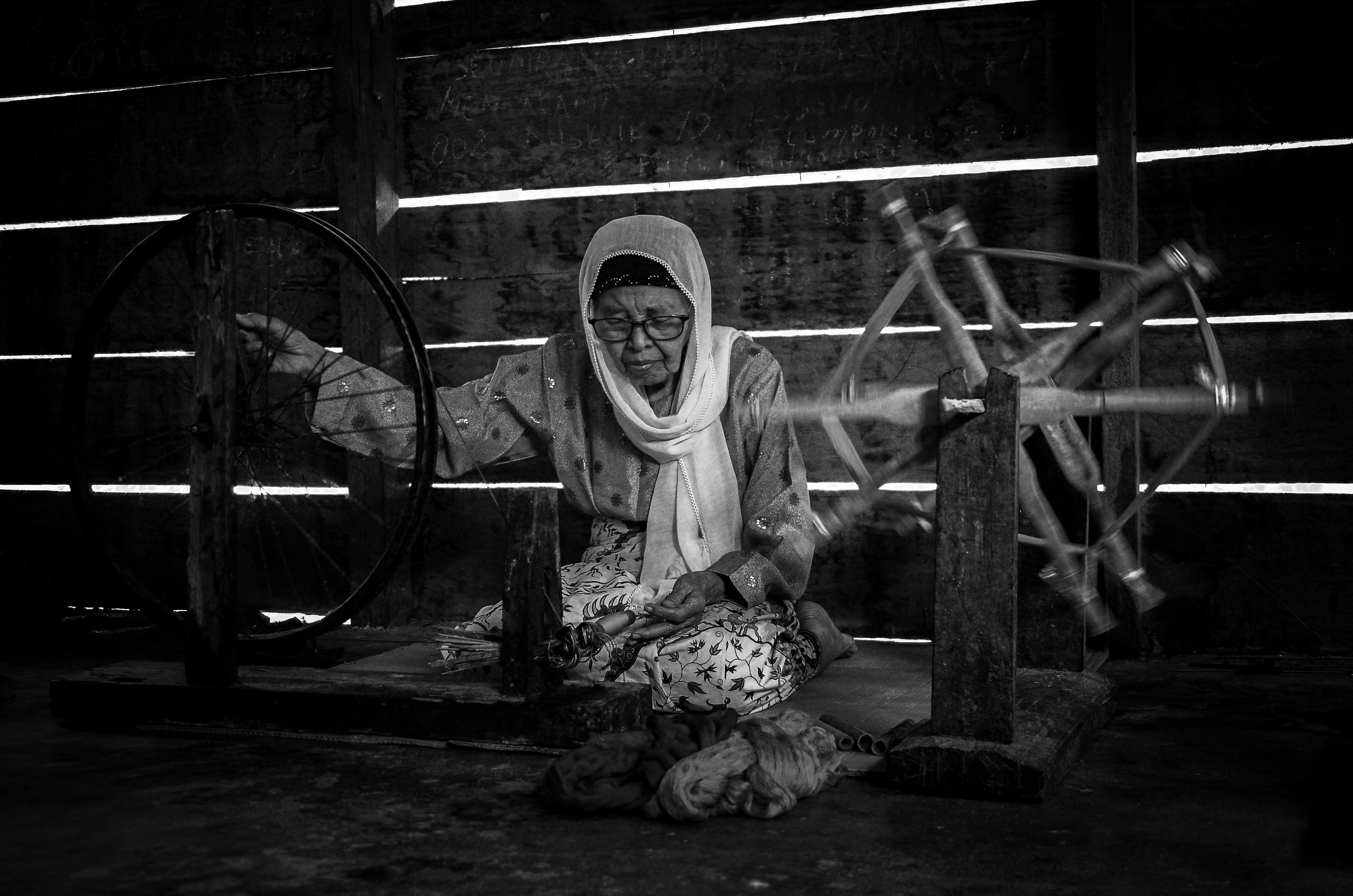
Manuriang is spinning yarn for weaving. A grandma doing Manuriang in Pandai Sikek, West Sumatra

=== Equipments and materials ===
There are two categories of songket weaving equipment; the main weaving equipment made from wooden or bamboo frame; and the supporting equipment which includes a thread stretching tool, a motif making tool, and thread inserting and picking tools. The materials for making songket consist of cotton, silk, or other fibers as the base fabric, and decoration threads made from golden, silver or silk threads. It is believed that in ancient times, real gold threads were used to create songket; the cotton threads were run along heated liquid gold, coating the cotton and creating gold thread. However today because the scarcity and the expensiveness of real gold threads, imitation gold or silver threads are commonly used instead.

=== Technique ===
The songket technique itself involves the insertion of decorative threads in between the wefts as they are woven into the warp, which is fixed to the loom. They are inserted as part of the weaving process, but not necessary in the making of the cloth. There are four types of supplementary weft weaving technique: continuous, discontinuous, inlaid and wrapped.

Songket weaving is done in two stages, weaving the basic cloth with even or plain weaving and weaving the decoration inserted into basic cloth, this method is called "inlay weaving system". The shining gold, silver or silk threads were inserted and woven into the plain weave base cloth in certain motifs, creating a shimmering effect of golden pattern against darker plain background. Songket weaving is traditionally done as a part-time job by young girls and older women in between their daily domestic chores. The complicated process of songket making is believed to cultivate virtues, as it reflects the values of diligence, carefulness and patience.

=== Patterns ===
There are hundreds of songket motifs. In Palembang tradition, songket is inseparable from the lives of the people who wear it during important events such as births, marriages, and death. Palembang songket recognises several types of songket patterns; they are lepus, tretes, limar, tawur, bungo, and rumpak songkets. Examples of Palembang songket motifs are naga besaung, pucuk rebung, biji pare, bintang berante, bintang kayu apuy, bungo mawar, bungo melati, bungo cino, bungo jepang, bungo intan, bungo pacik, cantik manis, lepus berakam, pulir, nampan perak, tabur limar and tigo negeri.

== Production centers ==
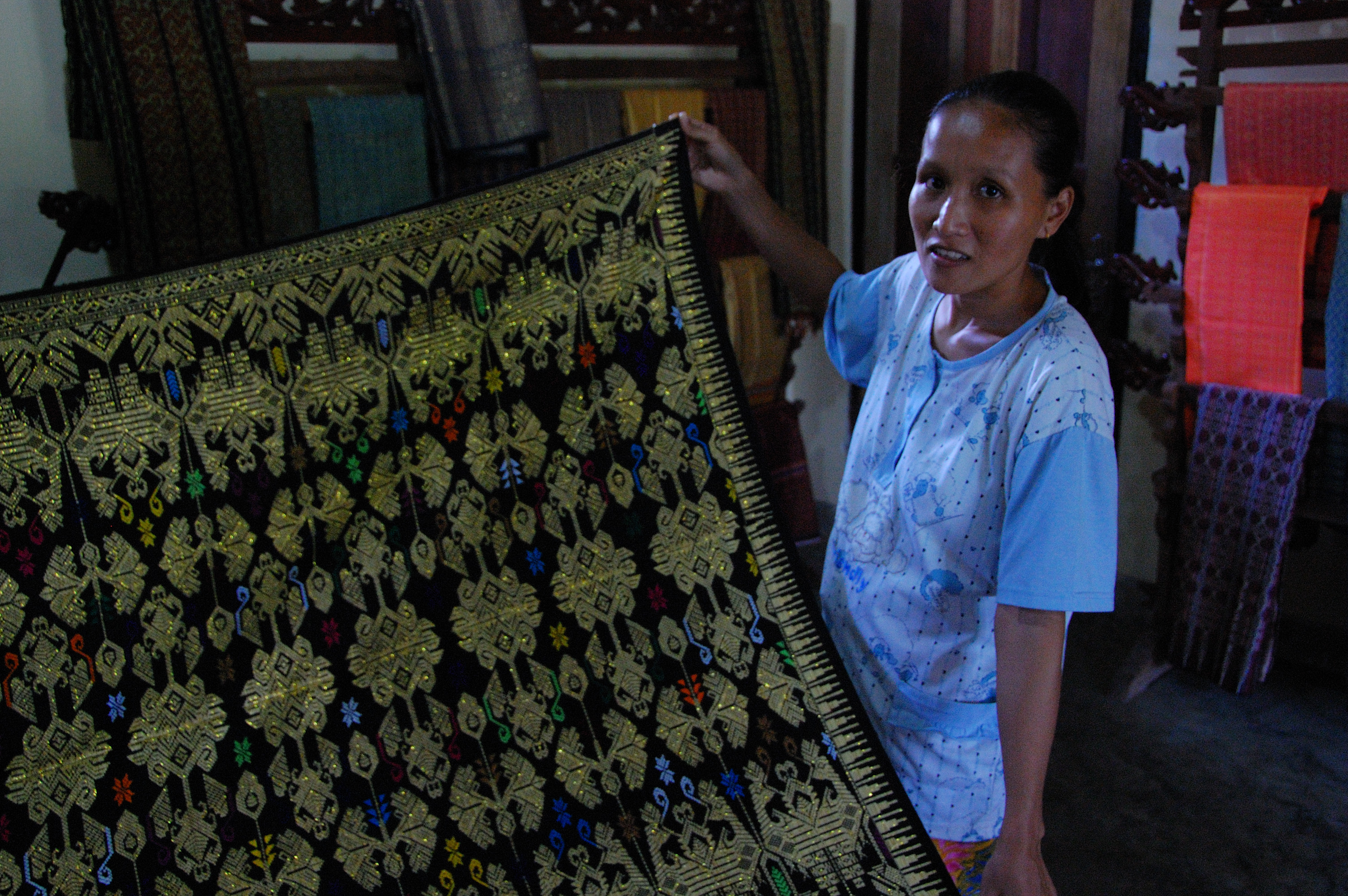
Sasak traditional songket, Lombok

In Indonesia, songket are produced in Sumatra, Kalimantan, Bali, Sulawesi, Lombok and Sumbawa. In Sumatra, the famous songket production centers are in Minangkabau Pandai Sikek in Tanah Datar Regency, Koto Gadang in Agam Regency, Silungkang area in Sawahlunto, West Sumatra, Jambi City, Jambi, and Palembang, South Sumatra. In Bali, songket producing villages can be found in Klungkung regency, especially in Sidemen and Gelgel villages. The Klungkung Market is a popular spot to shop Balinese songket, as it offers a wide assortment of this traditional fabric.

While in the neighboring island of Lombok, the Sukarara village in Jonggat district, Central Lombok regency, is also famous for songket making. In this village, learning how to weave a good songket is an obligation for the Sasak women. Weaving songket is usually done by women during their spare time, and subsequently this traditional skill enables them to earn money for their family.

In Malaysia, production includes the east coast of the Malay Peninsula, especially in the city of Kuala Terengganu, Terengganu, and the Kota Bharu, Kelantan.

== Gallery ==
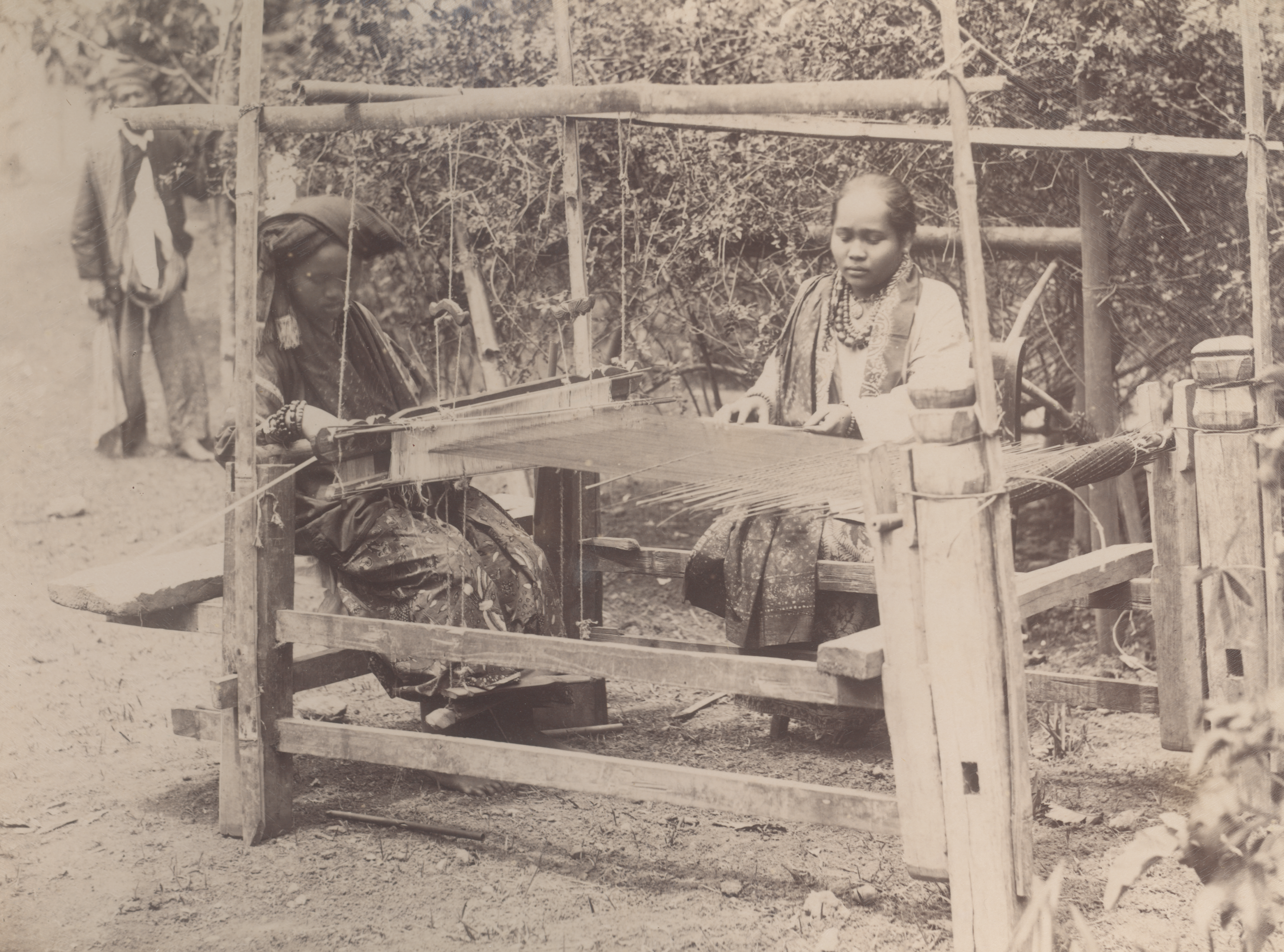
Songket weaver in West Sumatra c. 1890

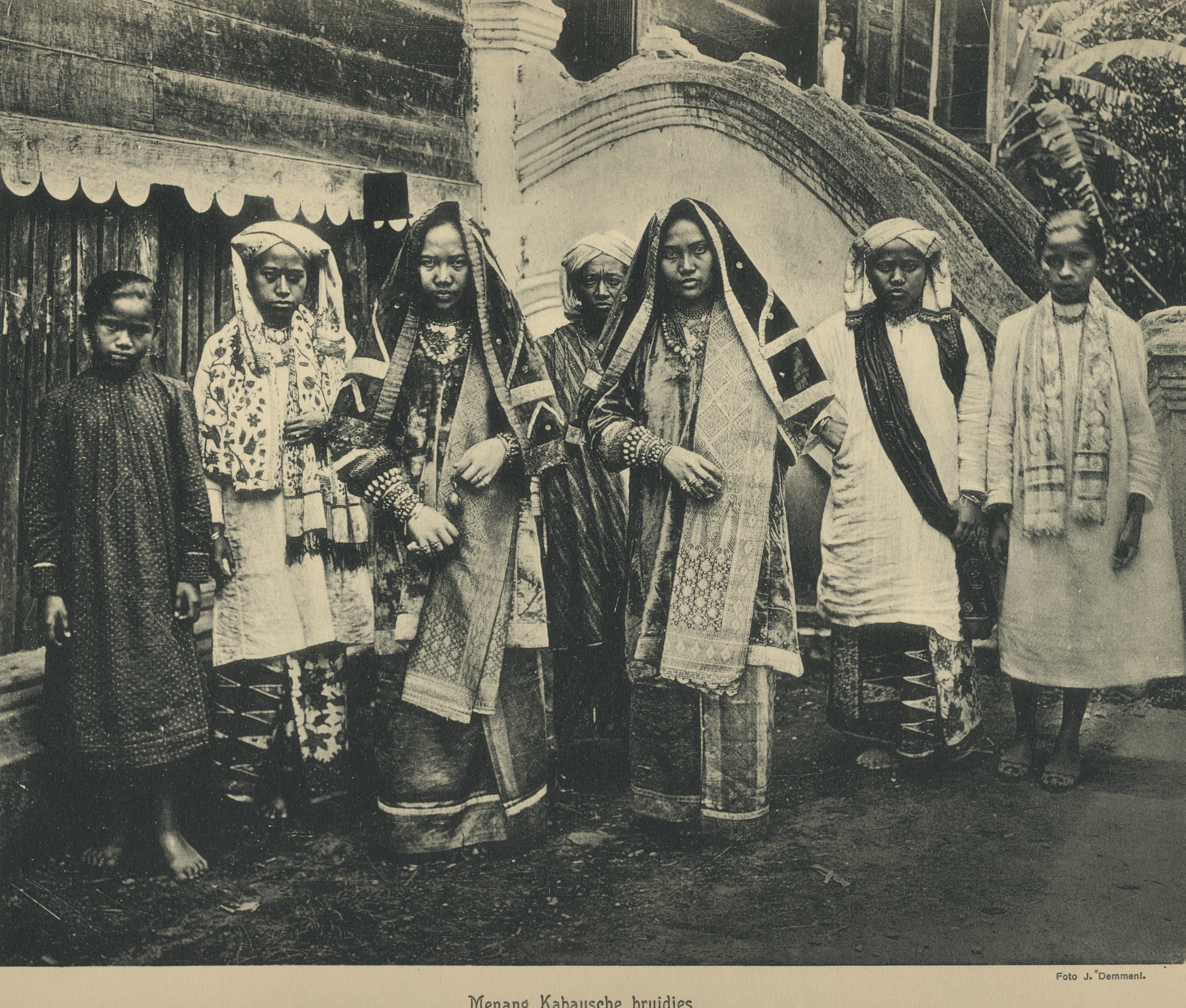
Minangkabau women in songket attire at Sumatra's west coast c. 1915

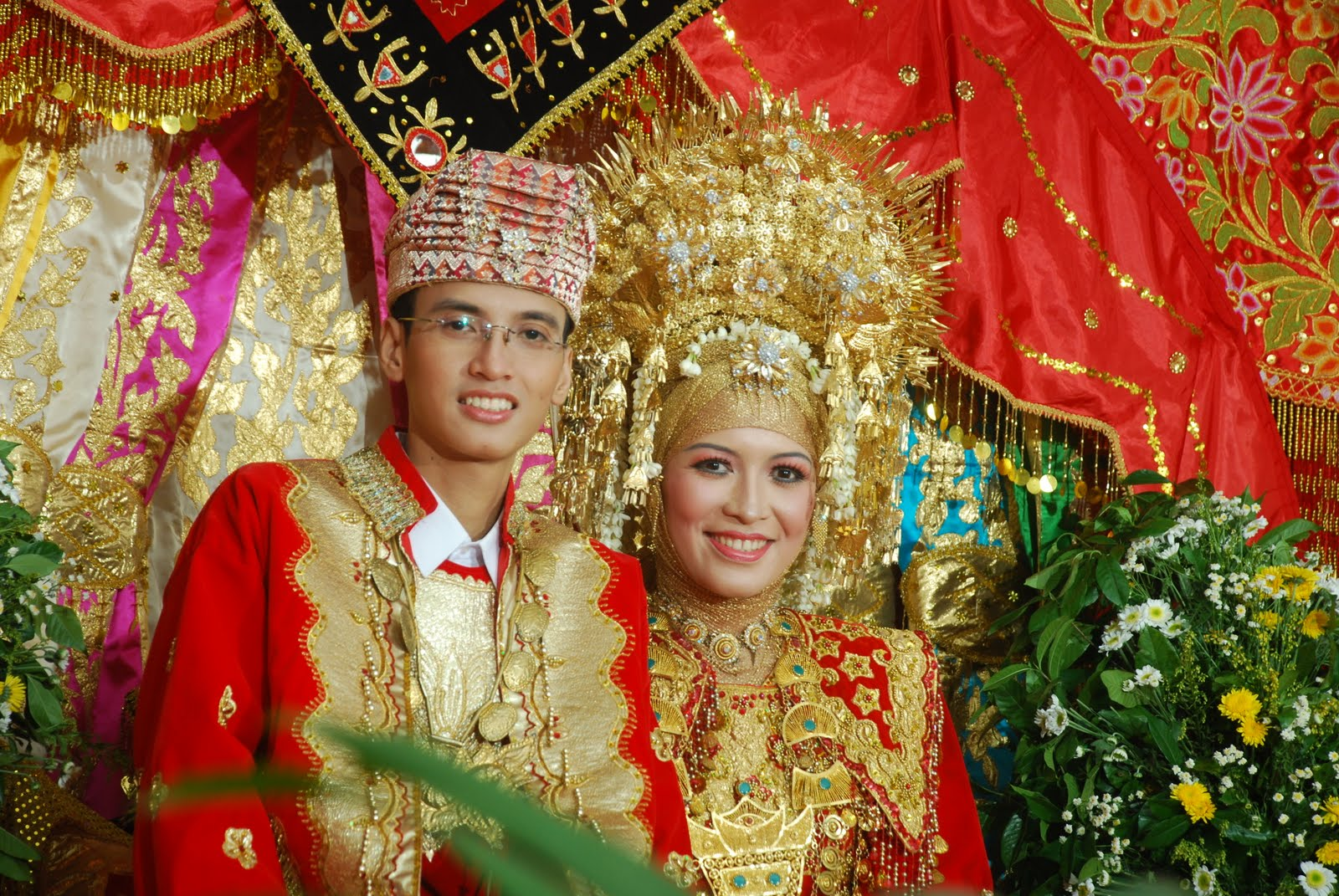
Songket Minangkabau traditional wedding costumes from Minangkabau, West Sumatra

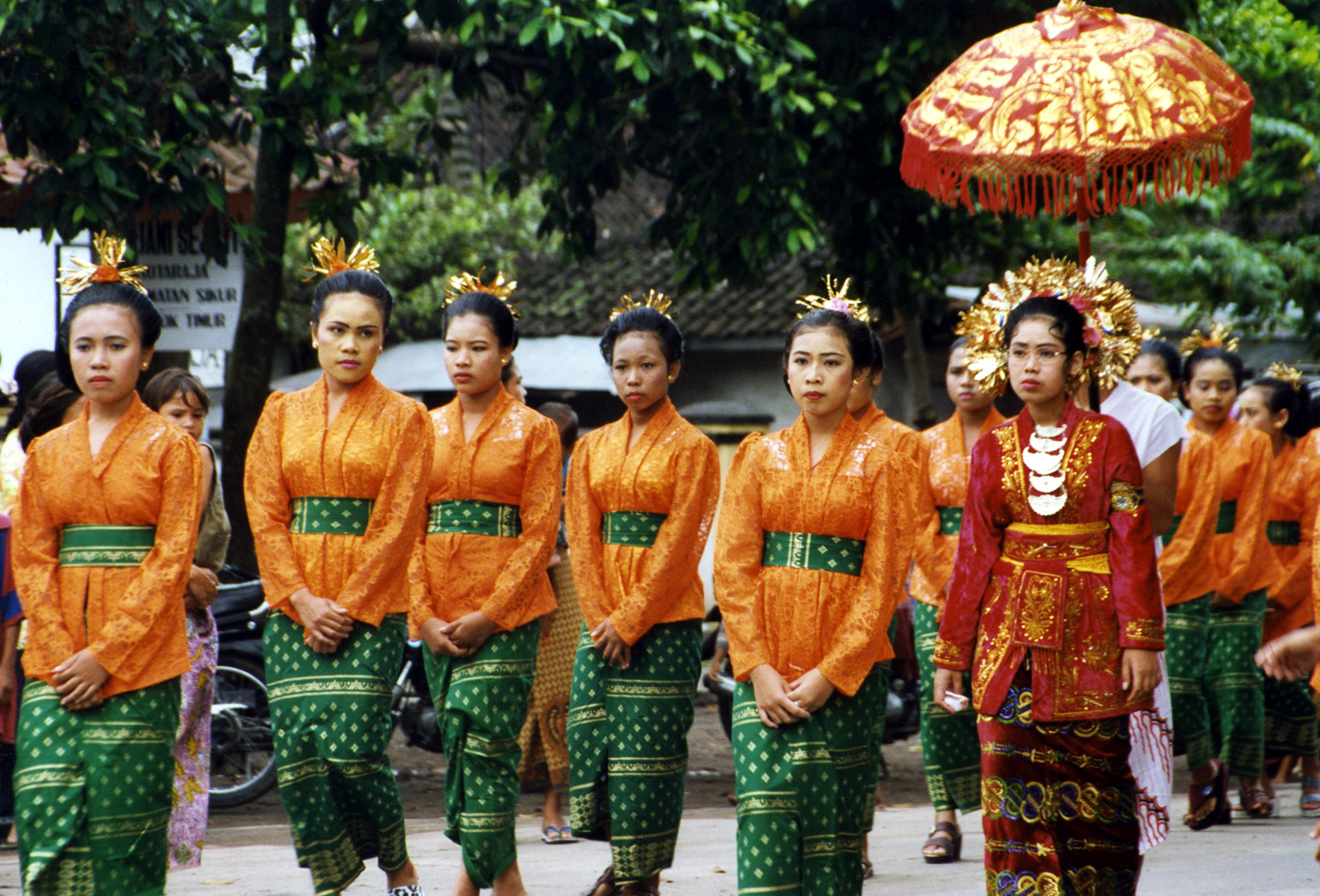
A Lombok wedding party using songket. In Lombok, most weddings are held during the month of April, and the parades are held on Sunday, West Nusa Tenggara.

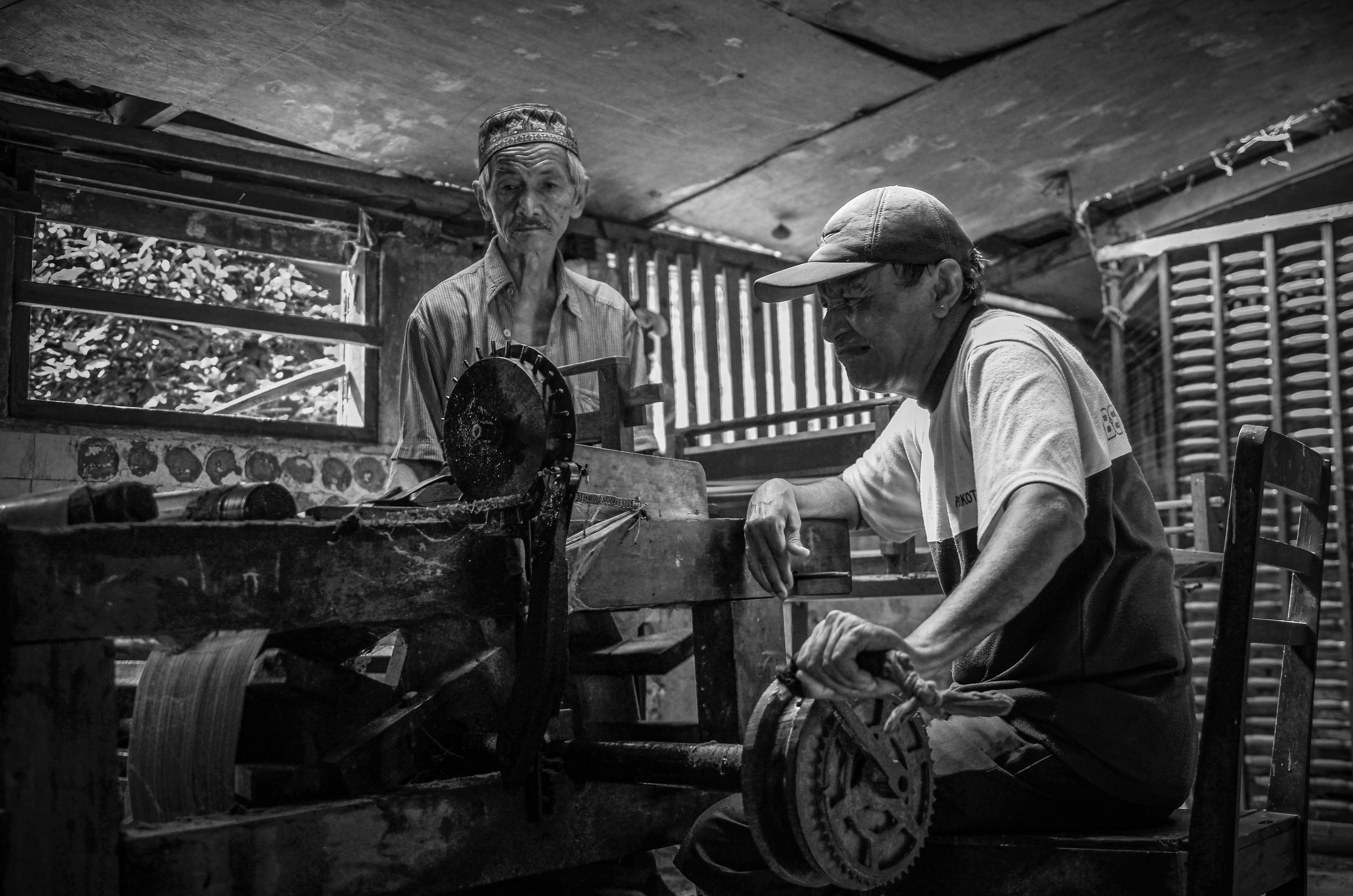
The stage of winding the weaving threads into a place where the spools of thread function as thread for the length of the songket cloth in Sumatra

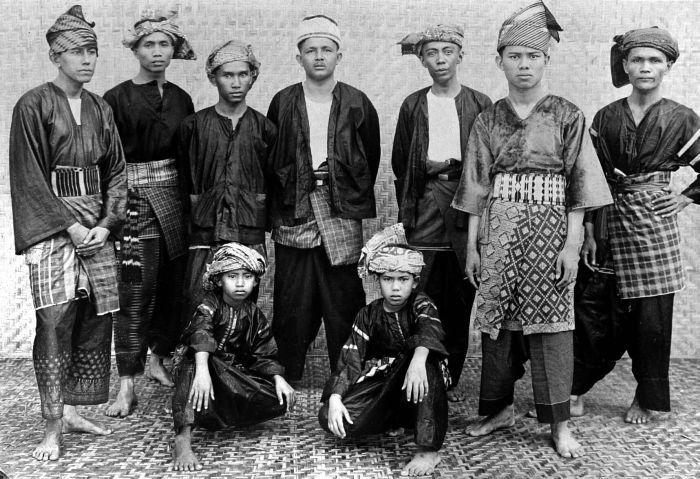
Minangkabau men from West Sumatra in traditional dress (songket), 1929

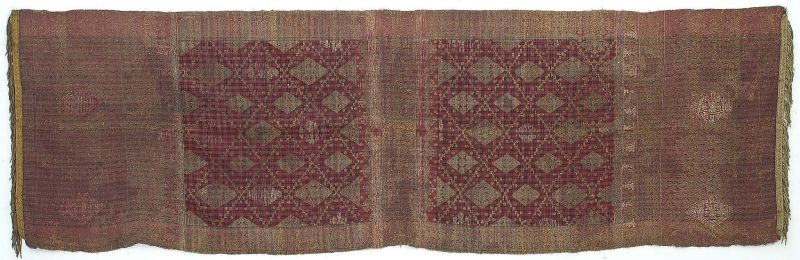
Shoulder cloth. The entire length of the plaid silk is decorated with gold thread (songket). The edges were decorated with gallons and gold trim, the shoulder cloth was silk with gold thread trimmings in Sumatra, circa 1900 (Tropenmuseum).

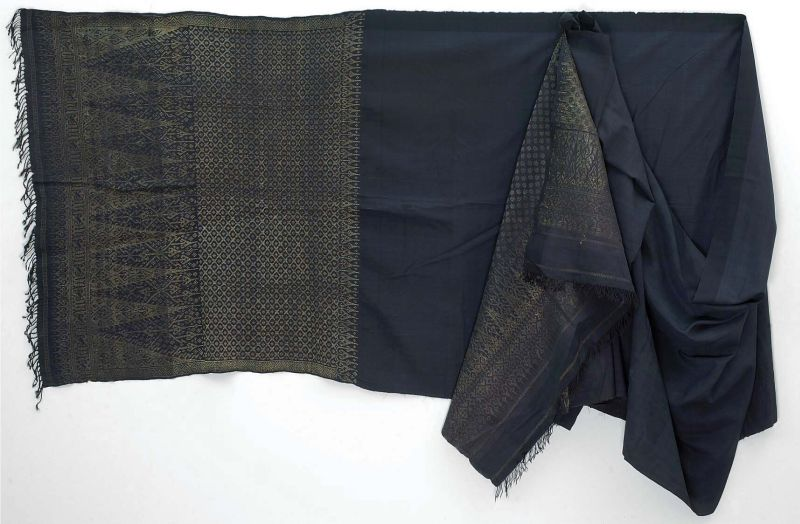
Selendang, Long silk scarf from Aceh, Sumatra. The ends are decorated with weft thread from the golden thread (songket) of the ceremonial shawl c. 1900.

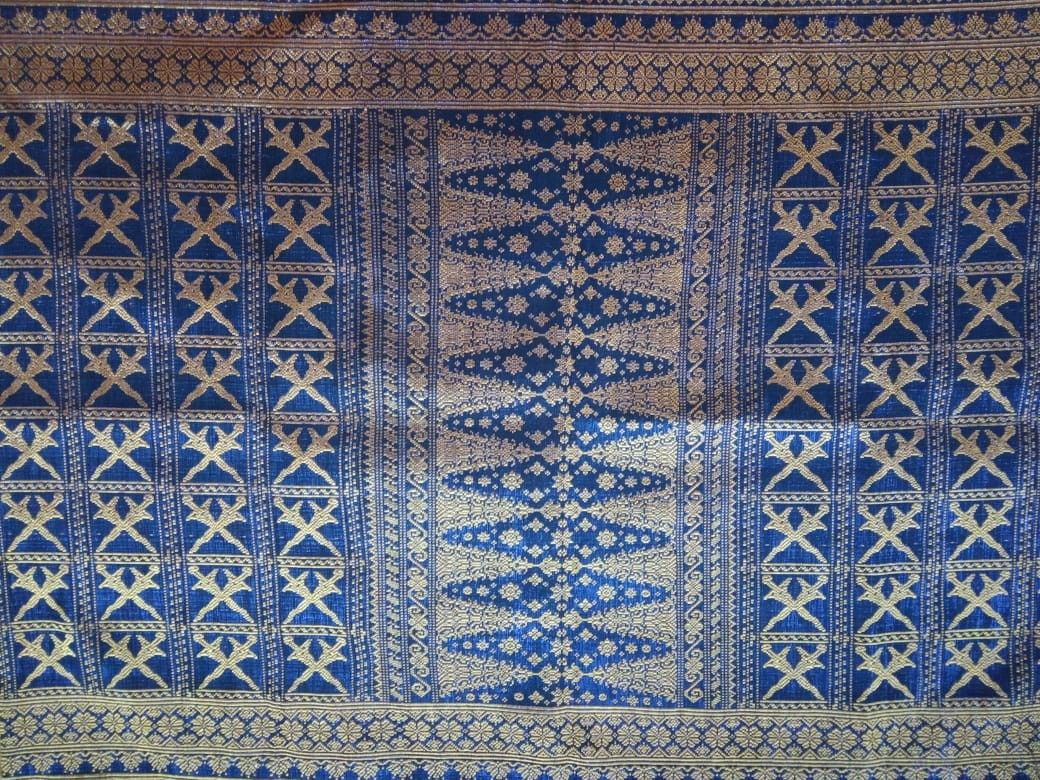
Songket fabric with keris motif with a bamboo shoot in the middle from West Sumatra. Pucuak rabuang is one of the Minangkabau traditional motifs.

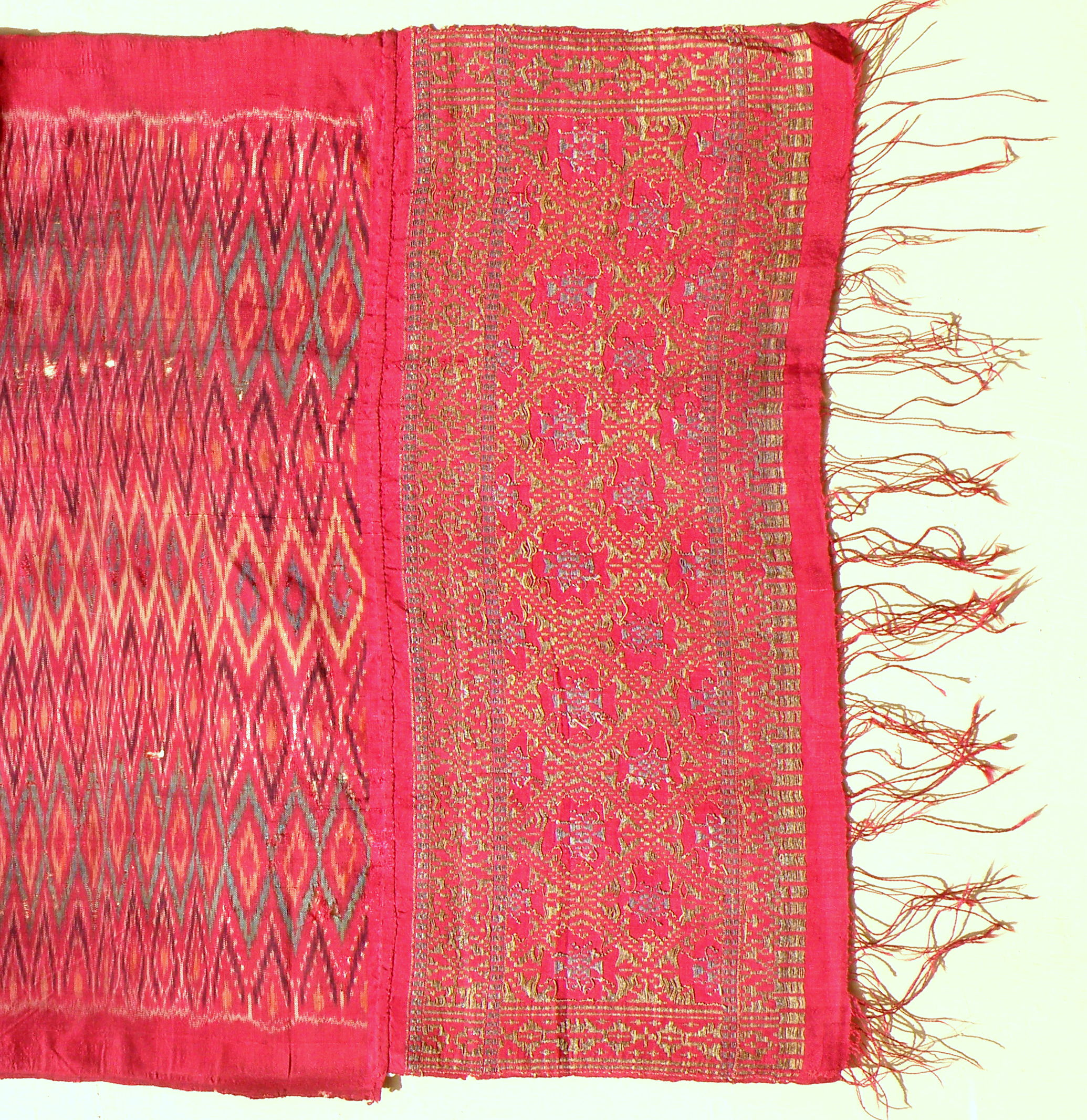
Detail of a songket sarong from Singaraja, the collection of Balique Arts of Indonesia. 1920s.

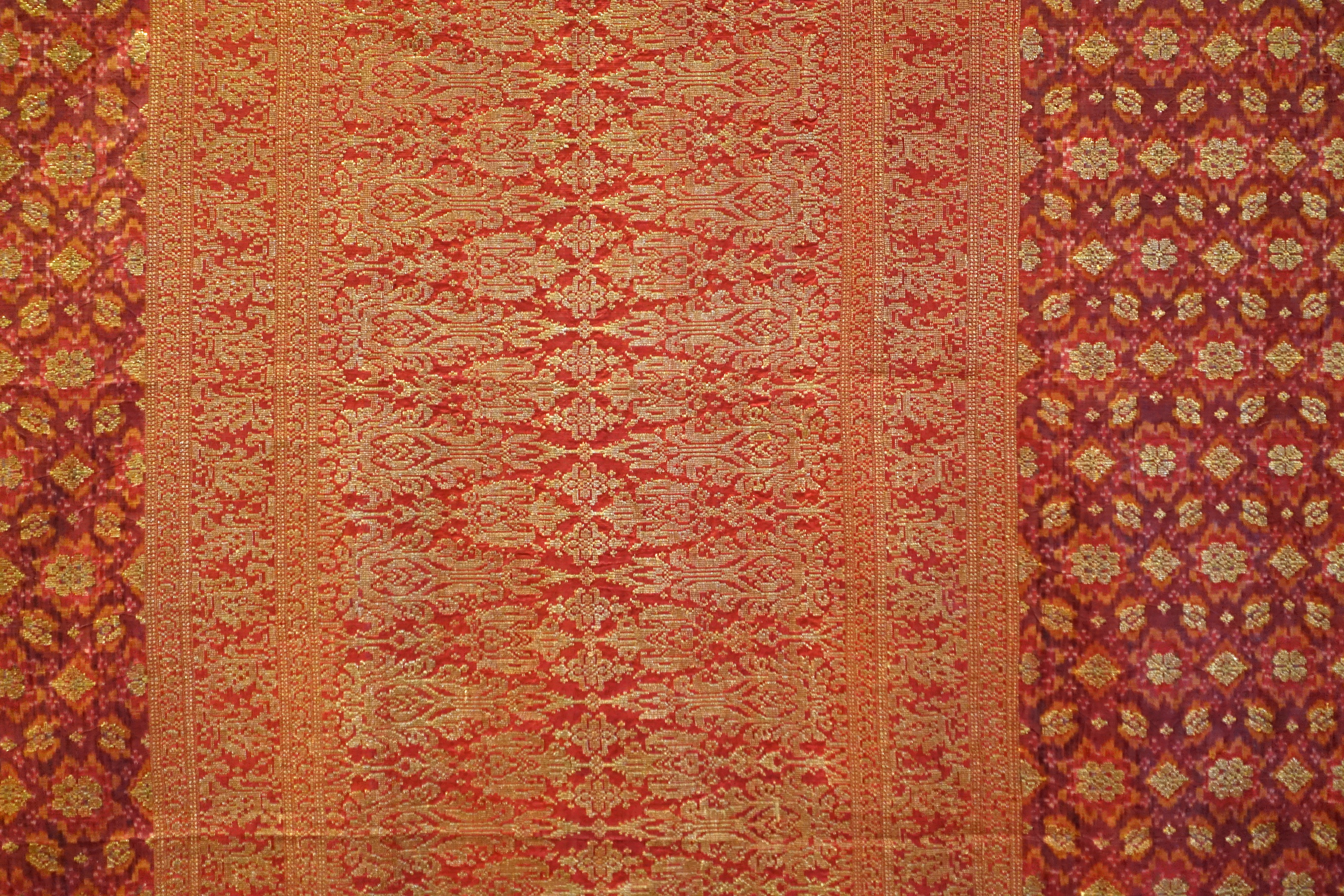
Terengganu songket, the Limar Songket Bertabur cloth from the 19th century, the collection of Textile Museum, George Washington University

== See also ==
- Batik
- Ikat
- Sarong
- Tapis
- Woven fabric
