= Singo Ulung =

Indonesian traditional dance

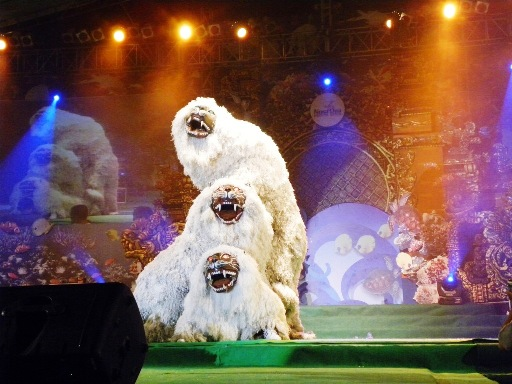
- A Singo Ulung performance
- Native name: ꦱꦶꦔꦲꦸꦭꦸꦁ (Javanese); Tari Singo Ulung (Indonesian)
- Instrument(s): Kendhang, Kenong
- Inventor: Javanese
- Origin: Bondowoso region of Indonesia

Singo Ulung (Javanese: ꦱꦶꦔꦲꦸꦭꦸꦁ, romanized: Singa Ulung, Javanese pronunciation: [siːŋɔ ʊlʊŋ]) is one of the original traditional dances from Bondowoso regency, East Java, Indonesia. The dance is played by two people in a lion-like costume (called Singo) and accompanied by music.

== Introduction ==
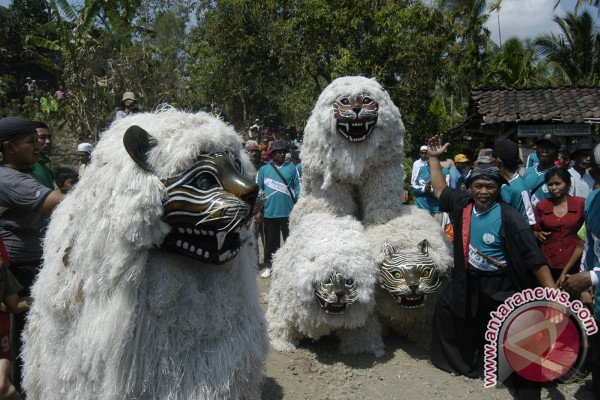
Singo Ulung performance in village

Singo Ulung is a masked dance art using barongan, which is the traditional art of Bondowoso regency that is usually performed at the anniversary of Bondowoso. After several years, this traditional art was also used for entertainment. Its creator, Singo, came from Ponorogo. His birth name was Mbah Singo Wulu because of his ability to turn into a lion. At first glance, this art form looks similar to Barongsai, the lion dance, but the costumes and the equipment are quite simple. The players wear training pants and T-shirts, and the lion-shaped costume is made of rope.

== History ==
The traditional dance was created by a respected man named Singo Wulu, who came from Ponorogo. He ran from Ponorogo to save himself and stayed in Blimbing village, Klabang district, Bondowoso. Singo Wulu and his wife Nyi Moena, with Ki Jasiman, were helping and cooperating to create a prosperous life for society at Blimbing village. He cared about the rice fields and other people's daily needs. Many people were proud of him. That's why he was chosen to become the first head of Blimbing village.

One day, he had an idea to create a public traditional dance called Singo Ulung, played by two people. This dance is accompanied by particular music, which makes the audience astonished. This art, Pojian art, and Ojung art are always shown at the traditional ceremony of Bersih Desa Blimbing held every year in the month of Syaban / Ruwah). On the other hand, this art performance can be enjoyed in the annual moment of Hari Jadi Bondowoso, precisely on 16 August.

== Costume ==
Singo Ulung dancers have a different costume for each role. For the lion "Singo Ulung’s" dancer costume, two people wear the lion costume together, like in Barongsai. The difference between Barongsai and Singo Ulung is that normally Singo Ulung's costume is plain white, and sometimes it's a mix of black and white, or yellow and white. The material of the costume is raffia string, decomposed until it looks like fur. Panji and Jasiman wear a costume similar to Tari Topeng's. The female dancers wear traditional dress like kebaya and sampur as accessories. The warok dancers wear all black with Madhure red-white shirts and bring cemethi as an attribute for their dancing.

== Development ==
Singo ulung is a unique performance, and it is attractive. Singo Ulung Art has become a tradition routinely performed in Blimbing village. A ritual village ceremony which performs the art of singo ulung traditionally. Research shows that the ritual village ceremony in Blimbing is conducted once a year, on 13-15 of the month of Sya’ban (it is believed that the existence of Blimbing Village). It is necessary to perform Singo Ulung in the ritual village ceremony because it is considered a main means and cannot be replaced by others. In addition, Singo Ulung is also often featured in the anniversary event of Bondowoso. The Singo Ulung dance is still being preserved and studied by several art galleries there. Besides the displays at the big event, the dance is also shown in other events, such as welcoming guests and at festivals, to preserve and introduce to the public the traditional art from Bondowoso.

== See also ==
- Sisingaan
- Barong
- Dance in Indonesia
