= Javanese Malaysians =

People of Javanese descent in Malaysia

Malaysians of Javanese origin
Total population
- unknown (including Malaysian citizens counted as "Malays") (Note: It is very difficult to find exact figures because Malaysian census data does not consider the Javanese as one ethnicity but part of the "Malays", according to the 1950 Malaysian census it was estimated that more than 189,000 Malaysian Malays were born to Javanese parents. This figure is very significant considering the number of Malaysian Malays at that time was just under 3 million. Javanese descendants form large communities in Johor, Selangor, Perak and other states in Malaysia.)

Regions with significant populations
- Mostly in Johor, Perak and Selangor states of the peninsula and a significant minority in Sabah and Sarawak.

Languages
- Majority: Malay and English; Minority: Javanese

Religion
- Mostly Muslim, significant minority of Christians and Hindus (among immigrants from Indonesia)

Related ethnic groups
- Javanese people, Malaysian Malays, Malay Singaporeans, other native Malaysians and Indonesians

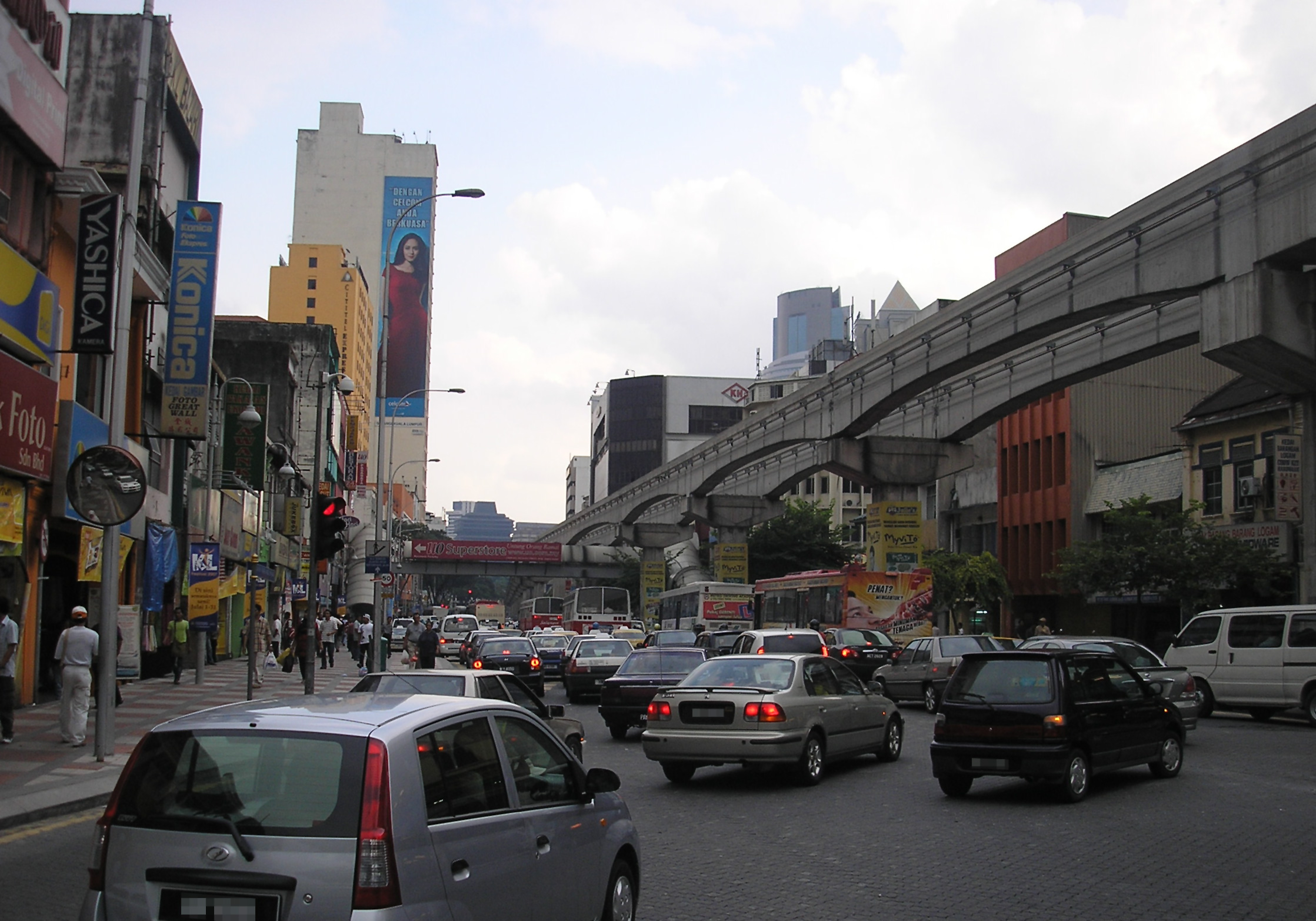
The Chow Kit area, known as a gathering place for the Javanese community in downtown Kuala Lumpur, Malaysia.

The Javanese Malaysians are people of full or partial Javanese descent who were born in or immigrated to Malaysia. They form a significant part of Malaysia's population and Malaysian law considers most of them to be Malays. Malaysia is home to the largest Javanese population outside Indonesia. The Javanese are not the only Indonesian ethnic group that has assimilated into Malaysian society; there are also the Minangkabau people, Bugis people, Banjar people, Bawean people, and others.

The majority of Javanese Malaysians originate from Central Java; the first wave came during the Shailendra era from the sixth to ninth century, then during the Singhasari, Srivijaya, and Majapahit era from the twelfth to fourteenth century. Political marriages between kingdoms, such as the union between Sultan Mansur Shah of Malacca and Princess Raden Galuh Chandra Kirana of Majapahit, serve as evidence of long-standing inter-ethnic interactions. This story is recorded in the 16th-century classical Malay manuscript, Sulalatus Salatin.

There were also migrants from the Dutch East Indies looking for new opportunities in British Malaya. Although many of them arrived during the colonial era, there are also those who arrived during World War II to both Japanese-occupied British Malaya and Borneo as forced labour. In the present day, they live predominantly in the West Malaysian states of Johor, Perak and Selangor, with significant minorities found in East Malaysia, especially in the states of Sabah and Sarawak.

Most Malaysians of Javanese descent have assimilated into the local Malay culture and speak Malaysian as a native tongue and first language rather than the Javanese language of their ancestors. This occurred through usual assimilation, as well as intermarriages with other ethnic groups. This qualifies them as Malays under Malaysian law. The situation is identical with the Javanese in Singapore, where they are considered Malay. The presence of Javanese people in Malaysia has become part of history and contributed to the country's development. Many political figures hold important positions in the Malaysian government, including Dato' Seri Ahmad Zahid Hamidi, who served as Deputy Prime Minister of Malaysia (Deputy Prime Minister) since 29 July 2015, and Muhyiddin Yassin, the President of the Malaysian United Indigenous Party and former holder of several ministerial positions in Malaysia. Several Malaysian artists also have Javanese ancestry, such as Mohammad Azwan bin Mohammad Nor, widely known as Wak Doyok, an entrepreneur and fashion icon, and Herman Tino, a pioneer of dangdut music in Malaysia.

== Historical similarities between Indonesia and Malaysia ==
The territorial expansion of Majapahit in the Nusantara region.

Nusantara is a term derived from two Sanskrit words: nusa (island) and antara (between). This is due to the geographical nature of the region, which consists of an archipelago of islands situated between the continents of Asia and Australia and located between the Indian Ocean and the Pacific Ocean. The History of Nusantara predates the formation of the modern nations now known as Indonesia, Malaysia, Singapore, Brunei Darussalam, and parts of the Philippines and Thailand. The peoples of the Nusantara region were historically united by ancient kingdoms such as Srivijaya, Majapahit, and other polities.

=== Colonial period ===
During the European colonial rule in Nusantara, many Javanese people were brought to the Malay Peninsula as laborers for oil palm and rubber plantations. Malaysia has a large Javanese-descended population, particularly in the State of Johor. Javanese people from Kulon Progo and Ponorogo migrated to the southern part of Johor from the 18th to the early 20th century. This Javanese diaspora mainly worked on plantations in Johor and Selangor. They preferred to live under British colonial rule, believing that the British treated indigenous laborers better than the Dutch Colonial Government.

Since the time of British colonial rule in Malaya, the capital of Selangor, Shah Alam, has been home to many Javanese migrants. In addition to the Javanese, there were also migrants from the Dutch East Indies, primarily from Sumatra Island, such as the Minangkabau people and the Acehnese people. These migrants established a settlement that is now known as Kampung Padang Jawa.

During its early establishment, Kampung Padang Jawa was a fertile agricultural area producing various fruits. At that time, its residents primarily worked as rubber tappers. Before the Klang River became polluted due to urban development, many villagers were fishermen, catching freshwater fish, giant river prawns, and belacan shrimp. The founder of Kampung Padang Jawa was a man named Wak Karian. According to local stories, Wak Karian was a courageous warrior and a respected figure within the community. He was of Javanese origin from Central Java. Wak Karian was the first person to clear land and establish Kampung Padang Jawa. His tomb can now be found in the Kampung Padang Jawa cemetery, located next to the Federal Highway in Selangor. The name Kampung Padang Jawa originates from the Javanese language, specifically from the word padhang, meaning "bright" or "illuminating an area." This refers to Wak Karian's efforts to open new land, which brought life and prosperity to the region. Over time, the settlement became widely known as Kampung Padang Jawa.

The results of the Malaysian population census in 1950 indicated that there were 189,450 people born in Java Island, 62,200 people from South Kalimantan (Banjar people), 26,300 people from Sumatra Island, 24,000 people from Bawean Island (referred to as Boyan in Malaysia and Singapore), and 7,000 people from Sulawesi Island (Bugis people).

== Javanese integration as Malays ==
The Javanese are not the only ethnic group from Indonesia that has contributed to the demographics of Malaysia. There are also people of Minangkabau, Bugis, Banjar, Mandailing, and other ancestries. In fact, the Minangkabau people established a government in the Malay Peninsula, which is now known as Negeri Sembilan. To this day, the Minangkabau remain dominant in both population and culture in the state of Negeri Sembilan. However, the national census in Malaysia classifies these Indonesian-origin ethnic groups as Malays. They possess the same rights and responsibilities as other Malays in accordance with Malaysia's constitution and laws. According to Article 160, Clause 2 of the Perlembagaan Persekutuan (Federal Constitution of Malaysia), a person is recognized as Malay if they fulfill the following criteria:

"Malay" means a person who professes the religion of Islam, habitually speaks the Malay language, adheres to Malay customs, and—

(a) was born before Merdeka Day in the Federation or Singapore, or was born before Merdeka Day and has at least one parent born in the Federation or Singapore, or was domiciled in the Federation or Singapore on Merdeka Day; or

(b) is a descendant of such a person.

This classification means that all ethnicities and races that meet the above criteria are officially recognized as Malays and are entitled to the privileges and responsibilities of Malays under Malaysian law.

In Malaysia, many Javanese people still speak the Javanese language in their daily lives, especially those residing in the states of Selangor, Perak, and Johor. However, younger generations of Javanese living in urban areas have largely lost their ability to speak Javanese, opting instead for standard Malay or other Malay dialects as their primary means of communication. Additionally, most Javanese Malays in Malaysia have adopted typical Malay names.

=== Malay rights and privileges ===
The "special privileges of Malays" were established by Malaysia's founding leaders as compensation for the willingness of the indigenous Malay population to accept Chinese and Indian ethnic communities as part of Malaya's multiracial society. These privileges are enshrined in Article 153 of the Perlembagaan Persekutuan Tanah Melayu 1948 (Federal Constitution of Malaya 1948). Since Javanese people are classified as Malays in Malaysia, they benefit from these special privileges granted by the Malaysian constitution. Below are some of the key privileges of Malays as outlined in the Federal Constitution of Malaysia:

- Government positions as certain high-ranking positions in the Malaysian government are reserved exclusively for Malays. One of the most significant positions that only a Malay can hold is the Yang di-Pertuan Agong, the head of state of Malaysia, who serves a five-year term.
- The allocation of scholarships and other educational assistance must prioritize Malays over non-Malays.
- Economic Assistance as regulations are designed to facilitate Malays in obtaining licenses or certifications for running businesses, enterprises, or other economic activities.

== Indonesia–Malaysia conflict over cultural and artistic claims ==
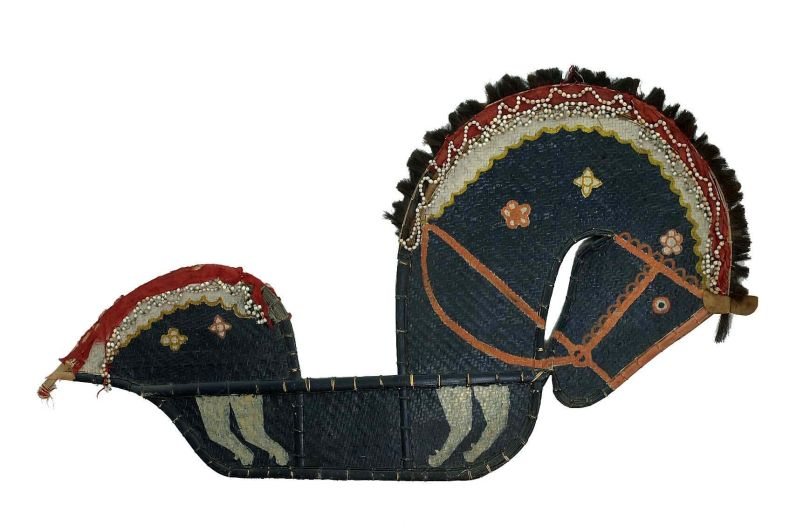
The kuda lumping dance, which inspired the national costume of Miss Grand Malaysia 2017.

Relations between Indonesia and Malaysia have often been strained due to disputes over claims to various forms of art and culture. Shared historical backgrounds, geographic proximity, and migration between the two countries have resulted in many cultural and artistic similarities. Javanese culture brought by Javanese immigrants has been at the center of several tensions between Indonesia and Malaysia, including disputes over Reog Ponorogo, wayang kulit, batik, kuda lumping, keris, and Javanese gamelan.

In 2007 the Indonesian public was angered by Malaysia's alleged claim to the Javanese art of Reog Ponorogo. The official website of the Malaysian Ministry of Culture, Arts, and Heritage displayed an image of the Reog Ponorogo performance. On the dadak merak mask worn by the dancers, the word "MALAYSIA" was inscribed. The Malaysian government described the performance on its website as Tari Barongan, explaining that the dance illustrated a story about Prophet Solomon and his ability to communicate with animals, including a tiger and a peacock, which were depicted in the performance. In response, Reog artists from Ponorogo Regency staged a protest at the Malaysian Embassy in Jakarta, expressing their opposition to Malaysia's claim over Reog. However, in late November 2007, Malaysia's Ambassador to Indonesia, Datuk Zainal Abidin Muhammad Zain, stated that the Malaysian government had never officially claimed Reog Ponorogo as part of its national culture. He explained that Reog, referred to as Tari Barongan in Malaysia, was found in Johor and Selangor due to migration by Javanese people during the Dutch and British colonial periods.

Malaysia was also reported to have attempted to claim batik in 2008. However, this time, the Indonesian government responded strategically by registering batik with UNESCO as part of the Masterpieces of the Oral and Intangible Heritage of Humanity. The process to obtain this recognition was lengthy, beginning with Indonesia's nomination of batik on 3 September 2008. UNESCO officially accepted the nomination on 9 January 2009, for further evaluation. Finally, on 2 October 2009, in Abu Dhabi, United Arab Emirates, UNESCO officially recognized Indonesian batik as part of the Intangible Cultural Heritage of Humanity. To commemorate this, the Indonesian government declared 2 October as National Batik Day.

During the Miss Grand International 2017 event in Phú Quốc, Vietnam, a controversy arose between Indonesian and Malaysian netizens over cultural claims. The conflict began when Malaysia's representative, Sanjeda John, presented a costume titled Kuda Warisan in the Best National Costume category, which was inspired by the traditional kuda lumping dance from the Javanese community in Indonesia.

The Miss Grand Malaysia organization later issued a clarification on its Instagram account, stating:

"This National Horse Costume is inspired by the Javanese community living in the southern region of Johor, Malaysia. In the early 20th century, migration of Javanese people from Indonesia under Dutch colonial rule and their arrival via Japanese trading ships introduced Javanese culture, including this unique dance, which was performed at various celebrations. In 1971, the Johor Ministry of Tourism officially recognized the kuda kepang dance as part of the cultural heritage of the Javanese people living in Johor and as a symbol of unity and diversity within Johor's cultural community. Due to historical similarities, Javanese culture has spread to the southern parts of Johor, Perak, and Selangor in Malaysia, as well as to Singapore."

Despite the clarification regarding the Kuda Warisan costume, the Instagram pages of Miss Grand Malaysia and Sanjeda John continued to be flooded with criticism from Indonesian netizens, who accused Miss Grand Malaysia of "stealing" Indonesian culture.

== Population ==
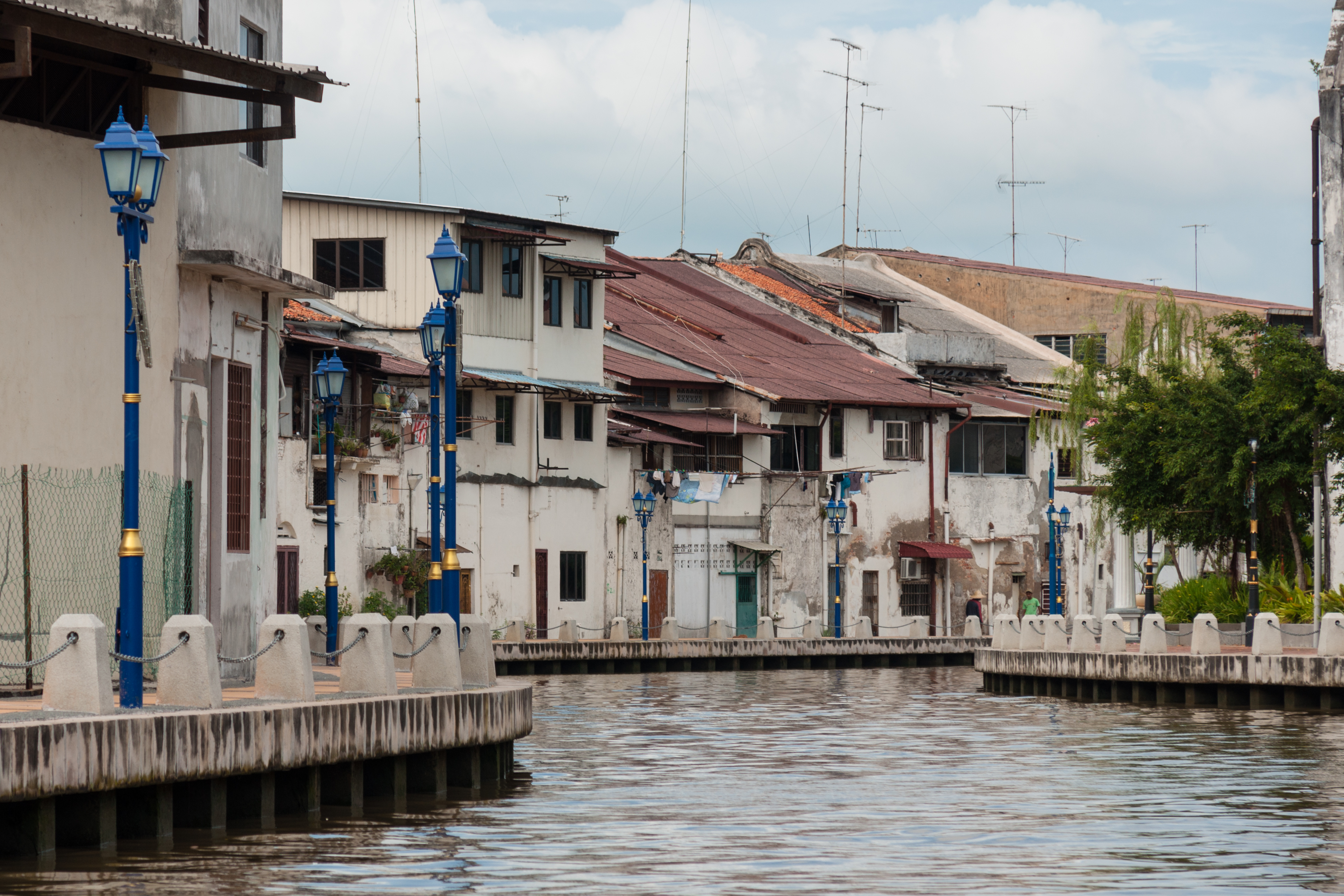
Javanese Village in Malacca.

The exact population of Javanese descendants in Malaysia is unknown, as the Malaysian census does not include a specific category for "Javanese." Malaysia's Constitution broadens the definition of Malay, leading to the integration of Javanese and other ethnic groups in Malaysia as part of the Malay community. In addition to Javanese people who have long settled in Malaysia and become Malaysian citizens, many Javanese from Indonesia also work in Malaysia. Major Javanese population centers in Malaysia can be found in Johor, Selangor, Malacca, Kuala Lumpur, and Perak. It is estimated that there are around 1,500,000 people of Javanese descent in Malaysia.

=== Indonesian migrant workers in Malaysia ===
The majority of Javanese people working in Malaysia are migrant workers employed in the informal sector. According to Statistics Indonesia (BPS), in 2015, the number of Indonesian migrant workers (TKI) in Malaysia was recorded at 97,635 individuals. However, this figure does not include undocumented Indonesian migrant workers.

Cases involving Indonesian workers in Malaysia frequently make headlines. One of the most notable cases of abuse against an Indonesian female migrant worker was the case of Ceriyati. In 2007, Ceriyati, a domestic worker from Brebes Regency, Central Java, attempted to escape from her employer's apartment through a window due to severe mistreatment. She tried to climb down from the 15th floor using a rope but was stranded on the 6th floor, requiring rescue by the local fire department. Ceriyati’s story gained significant public attention in both Indonesia and Malaysia. Her case became a turning point in reforming the management of Indonesian migrant workers, including updating the records of Indonesian laborers in Malaysia.

== Javanese-Malaysian figures ==
- Adam Sinclair, film director
- Ahmad Zahid Hamidi, 11th and 14th Deputy Prime Minister of Malaysia
- Aisha Retno, musician
- Ashraf Sinclair, actor
- Aziz Sattar, actor and comedian
- Djamal Tukimin, writer
- Mohamed Rahmat, former Minister of Information of Malaysia
- Muhyiddin Muhammad Yassin, 8th Prime Minister of Malaysia
- Norizam Tukiman, entrepreneur
- Nur Jazlan Mohamed, politician
- Sahruddin Jamal, former Chief Minister of Johor

== Gallery ==
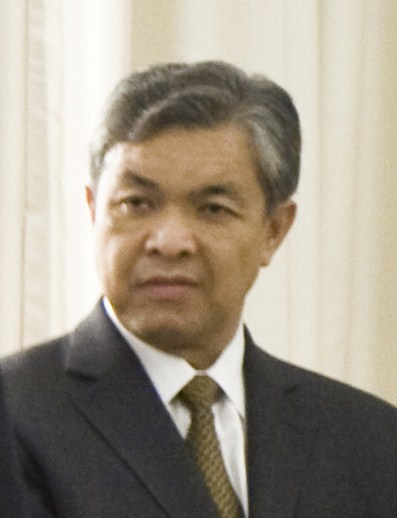
Ahmad Zahid Hamidi, former Deputy Prime Minister of Malaysia.

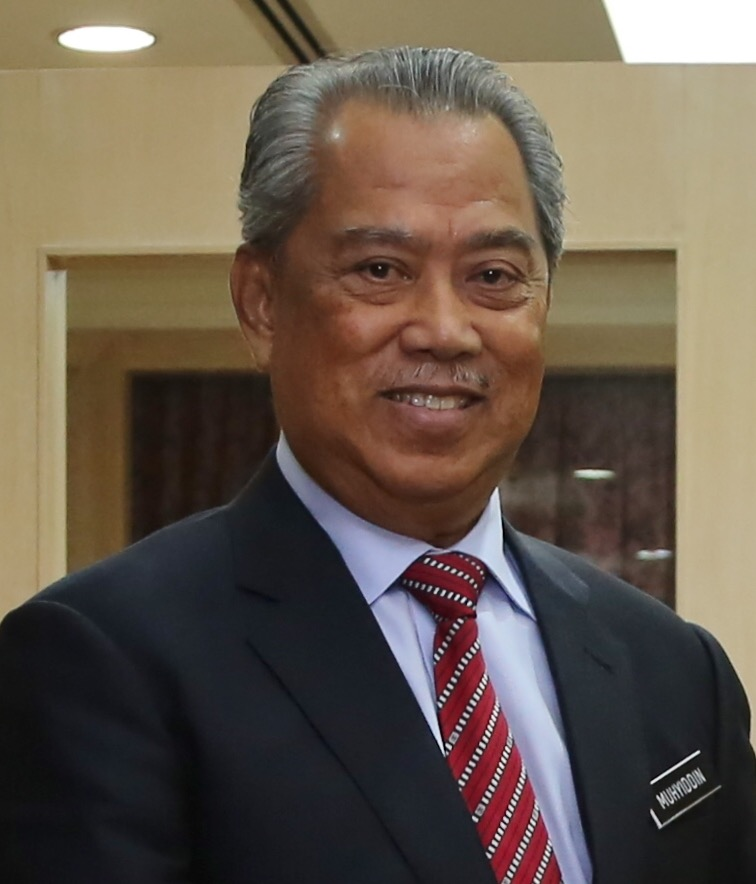
Muhyiddin Yassin, 8th Prime Minister of Malaysia.
