= Homosexuality in Indonesia =

Homosexuality in Indonesia is generally considered a taboo subject by both Indonesian civil society and the government. Public discussion of homosexuality in Indonesia has been inhibited because human sexuality in any form is rarely discussed or depicted openly. Traditional religious mores tend to disapprove of homosexuality and cross-dressing.

In Indonesia, where religion plays a dominant role in society, and where more than 80 percent of the population are Muslim, homosexuality is not punishable by national law, but condemnation of homosexuality has been voiced by many religious leaders. The national criminal code does not prohibit cross-dressing or adult, non-commercial and consensual homosexual conduct between consenting adults, although it does contain a higher age of consent for same-sex sexual conduct, and there are some reports that police have sometimes harassed gay or transgender people using vaguely worded public indecency laws. Indonesia's northwesternmost province of Aceh (the only province in which shari’ah is applied), has a sharia-based anti-homosexuality law that punishes anyone caught having gay sex with 100 lashes.

Beyond the national laws, overt violence against gay or transgender people, by civilians, is still rare. Generally, such violent intolerance is restricted to members of religious vigilante groups such as the radical Islamist groups.

The general public is becoming more aware of the existence of gay and transgender people through greater press and media content, but this has not necessarily led to greater tolerance. In particular, there have been more depictions and discussions of homosexuality in the Indonesian news media, also depictions of gay lifestyles in Indonesian television and films. Indonesia does have a reputation as being a relatively moderate and tolerant Muslim nation; however, the recent survey revealed that intolerance of minorities is growing, with the highest level of hostility directed at the gay and lesbian community. The Indonesian Survey Circle (LSI) found in its most recent poll conducted in 2012 that 80.6 percent of its sample population objected to having gays or lesbians as neighbors. The figure has jumped significantly from 64.7 percent in 2005.

In recent years, LGBT people in Indonesia are facing growing hostility and intolerance. In early 2016, LGBT people and activists in Indonesia faced fierce opposition and attacks of homophobia and hate speech, even launched by Indonesian authorities.

Coming out to family and friends is seldom carried out by LGBT people in Indonesia, as they are more afraid of rejection and social backlash. Nevertheless, there are some rare examples of understanding and acceptance by the family of LGBT people.

== Public view ==
In Indonesian culture, sexuality in any form is considered a taboo subject and often immediately judged as an obscenity. Sexuality, let alone homosexuality, issues are considered a very private matter that must be confined only within bedrooms. In Indonesian culture the concept of malu (shame/embarrassment or 'losing face') is prevalent. Indonesian people are generally tolerant towards homosexuals but prefer not to talk about it because of the strong culture of malu in Indonesian society. Waria, the male to female cross dressers for a long time have played their parts in Indonesian culture. Numerous Indonesian traditional performances such as lenong and ketoprak often featuring transsexuals as an object of jest, humor and ridicule. While ludruk drama and lengger lanang dance performance featuring male cross dresser as female dancer. Even today, gay and transsexuals can be found performing in Indonesian television and entertainment industry. In Indonesian view, it is quite acceptable to have transsexual or cross dresser entertainers or public figures. It is usually considered as a funny thing, unless it were to happen in their own family where having effeminate sons are often considered as a disgrace to the family.

Due to its perception as a humorous taboo, homosexuality is used as a punchline for Indonesian jokes, most notably in the Jomok internet subculture, which is named as a portmanteau of the words joke and homok (Indonesian slang for homosexual) and refers to the creation and distribution of online content featuring recontextualised images or video clips from gay pornography, usually with the intent of shocking viewers and with emphasis placed on clips featuring actors of black origin to subvert hypermasculine stereotypes of black men. Content affiliated with the Jomok trend, specifically those featuring American adult content creator Perrell Brown, better known by his stage name Dreamybull, were first posted by Indonesian internet users in 2021 and accumulated 1.7 billion views on TikTok by 2023. Exposure to Jomok-themed humor has extended to online content outside Indonesia, including satirical and misleading posts on Facebook involving public figures and political events.

A 2019 Pew Research Center opinion showed that 9% of the Indonesian population believes that homosexuality should be accepted by society, while 80% believes it should not. The percentage of Acceptance for Homosexuality was a gradual increase from the census conducted by the Pew Research Center earlier in 2013, which shows that only 3% of the Indonesian population believes that homosexuality should be accepted, whereas 93% believes it should not.

== Opposition to homosexuality ==
Traditionally Indonesians are quite tolerant towards LGBT people, as long as they keep quiet and stay discreet about their private lives. However, this level of tolerance is not extended towards LGBT rights movements, which recently faces fierce condemnation launched by Indonesian authorities and extended to public sphere. The anti-LGBT rhetoric began in January 2016 when Higher Education Minister Muhammad Nasir said LGBT people should be barred from university campuses.

The national broadcasting commission emphasize a policy banning TV and radio programs that make LGBT behavior appear "normal", saying this was to protect children and teenagers who are "susceptible to duplicating deviant LGBT behaviors". The Indonesia Psychiatric Association classified homosexuality, bisexuality and transgenderism as mental disorders. Some even went to conspiracy theory rhetoric; Defence Minister Ryamizard Ryacudu called the LGBT movement a "proxy war" to brainwash Indonesians, that received "foreign funding", while pointing out funds from United Nations organizations like UNAIDS or Western governments and foundations.

There have been a few incidents of LGBT people being harassed. LGBT groups are now working to set up safehouses and draw up evacuation plans in case of need. In Yogyakarta, in February 2016, 23 LGBT activists were roughed up by police, who told local media they stopped them from holding a rally to avoid a clash with a hardline Muslim group holding an anti-LGBT protest nearby.

In February 2016, the public discourse and debates on homosexuality and LGBT issues has intensified with the occurrence of high-profile cases of alleged homosexual misconducts, involving Indonesian celebrities. First, an accusation of sexual approach and harassment done by TV personality Indra Bekti upon several men. Followed by the case of dangdut singer Saiful Jamil, who has been named a suspect in a sexual assault involving an underage male fan.

On the other hand, amids fierce hostilities, some officials have defended the LGBT community - including Jakarta Governor Basuki Tjahaja Purnama and Security Affairs Minister Luhut Pandjaitan. "Whoever they are, wherever they work, he or she continues to be an Indonesian citizen. They have the right to be protected as well," Pandjaitan said.

== History ==
Because of the culture of shame attached to homosexuality, homosexual activity is rarely recorded nor depicted in Indonesian history. Unlike in other Asian cultures such as Indian, Chinese or Japanese, homosexual erotica in paintings or sculptures are almost nonexistent in Indonesian arts. A rare exceptions is the 18th-century account of alleged homosexuality of Arya Purbaya, an official in Mataram court, although it is not clear whether it was actually based on truth or vicious rumors to disgrace him.

The Javanese book Serat Centhini composed and published circa 1814 in Surakarta, mentioned several account of bisexuality and homosexuality practice in Javanese society. Story in this book which took place circa 1630, mentions that one of the main character, Mas Cabolang and his attendants encountered homosexual couple the Jathilan dancers in Ponorogo region. Mas Cabolang and one of his handsome attendant encountered more sexual experience with women as well with the jathils men. There are also an incident where he and Nurwitri, one of his handsome and effeminate entourage, encountered a homosexual affair with the regent of Wirosobo.

However even though homosexual relationship portrayals were rarely recorded locally, it exists and there are local terms used to describe it. In the traditional matrilineal Minang society, homosexuality exists between older men called Induk Jawi (lit. mother cow) with younger men called Anak Jawi (lit. calf). Objective Minang observer who had not been influenced by western homophobic attitudes attested to its existence. Anthropologists have attributed this relationship in the exclusively male Surau, which is a local mosque used to taught Islamic teachings with pubescent boys, but also to the relationship between teachers and students of Pencak Silat. In that respect it is similar with the homosexual relationships attested in Pesantren in Serat Centhini. Although it could also take the form of mairilan relationships between the older students and the younger students (the mairil). The relationships continue until after heterosexual marriage with the men's wives usually aware of her husband's mairil partners. Other terms used include amrot-amrotan (from Arabic Imrot meaning women) and musahaqoh to describe lesbian relationships between female students.

Western observers have also noted other examples, including from Hurgronje who noted homosexual relationships in Aceh between aristocrats Uleebalang and their teenage slaves from Nias, and also between Acehnese traders from eastern coast. His works also mention of homosexual relationships in Surakarta-Yogyakarta, and in West Sumatra among the Minangkabau. Hurgronje findings concur with Dr. Julius Jacobs who conducted research in Banyuwangi among the Balinese in the late 19th century. Madurese-Dutch dictionaries compiled by missionaries P. Penninga and H. Hendriks mentioned 'dalaq' meaning 'schandjongen' (catamite). Its derivative word include 'adalaq' (passive form 'kadalaq') which means anal intercourse. Dalaq relationships usually exist between two boys or teenagers who are best friend. Considering the compilers were Christian leaders, they presumably condemned such act, its inclusion probably indicates how common this relationship among the Madurese. These homosexual behaviors were usually common in communities where its members are exclusively one sex (i.e. all males) or contacts with opposite sexes are prohibited, presumably resulting in a dearth of available sexual outlets. However, 'homosexual' in this section doesn't mean that its participants identifies with it as a label or identity, as is the meaning in western society.

Although waria, male to female transgender performers and prostitutes have long played their role in Indonesian culture, the Indonesian gay men and lesbian women homosexual identity has only been recently identified, mainly through identification with their western counterparts through film, television, and media. Prior to Suharto's New Order regime local Indonesian culture of gay and lesbi did not exist.

The gay and lesbian movement in Indonesia is one of the oldest and largest in Southeast Asia. Indonesian gay right activism began since 1982 when the first gay rights interest group was established in Indonesia. The "Lambda Indonesia" and other similar organizations arose in the late 1980s and 1990s. Today, some of the major LGBTQ associations in the nation include "Gaya Nusantara" and "Arus Pelangi". There are now over thirty LGBT groups in Indonesia.

Yogyakarta, Indonesia, hosted a 2006 summit on LGBT rights that produced the Yogyakarta Principles on the Application of International Human Rights Law in Relation to Sexual Orientation and Gender Identity. However, a summit in March 2010 in Surabaya was met with condemnation from the Islamic Defenders Front and was disrupted by conservative protesters.

=== Radicalization of law and practice since 2016 ===
Recently, Indonesian politicians and government officials made a series of homophobic comments, that ended in a series of rule proposals with clear anti-gay tenor. Several human rights organizations as the Human Rights Watch are concerned. Discriminatory police raids conducted against homosexual men by the pornography law can lead to an imprisonment of 15 years. In April 2017, in Aceh, a homosexual couple had consensual coitus in the privacy of their own home. They face public flogging based on the Sharia (Islamic laws). This is against international anti-torture law.

Increased police raids along with a changing political culture forced the closure of most of Jakarta's gay bars and clubs, the hub of gay life in Indonesia outside of Bali, and in 2017 the last operating gay club in Jakarta, Apollo, closed its doors, but has since opened again in 2018 and changed its name to True Lounge in 2019.

== Traditions ==
Although the subjects of homosexuality are considered as a shame and people often refuse to discuss it in public, some culture and traditions in Indonesia records same sex relationships and activities, or LGBTQ behaviors.

=== Bissu, Calabai and Calalai ===
The Bugis people of South Sulawesi divide their society into five separate genders. Two are analogous to cisgender male (oroané) and female (makkunrai), and the remaining three are bissu, calabai and calalai. A bissu refer to a person with all aspects of genders combined to form a whole. A calabai is a 'false woman', they are generally physically male but take on the role of a heterosexual female. On the other hand, calalai is a person who is assigned female at birth but takes on the roles of a heterosexual male in the society. Calabai shares similarities with, yet is not identical to, effeminate gay men and the kathoeys of Thailand, while calalai is quite similar to butch lesbians.

=== Warok and Gemblakan ===
Particular traditional homosexual relations are exemplified in the warok-gemblakan rituals of the East Javanese people. Waroks are Javanese local heroes or "strong men" that usually perform traditional arts such as the Reog Ponorogo. According to tradition, a warok is required to be abstinent and thus is prohibited to indulge and be involved in sexual relationships with women. However, a warok does not remain completely celibate as having sex with boys between the ages of eight and fifteen is permitted as a substitute. The boy lover in this ritualized relationship is called the gemblak. The gemblak is usually kept by the warok in his household with the full agreement of the boy's family, which included compensation. Later on in his life a warok could be married with a woman as his wife, but was also allowed to keep a gemblak as a lover on the side. The warok-gemblakan relationships were thus similar to the pederastic rituals and traditions common to ancient Greece. These traditional ritualized relationships remained especially prevalent in Ponorogo, where there are older warok who may still have gemblak lovers. However, these older men have never identified as homosexuals, and neither have their young lovers.

Today the warok-gemblakan practice is discouraged by local religious authorities, especially through public moral opposition. As a result, modern-day Reog Ponorogo performances rarely feature gemblakan boys as performers taking on the role of Jatil horsemen. These traditional performance roles are now mostly played by girls.

=== Lengger lanang ===
Lengger lanang (Javanese for "male lengger dancer") is an effeminate male that dances the traditional lengger dance and performs the role as a woman. Lengger dance is the Banyumas' counterpart of Javanese ronggeng dance. According to local Banyumas tradition, it can be performed either by women or a man dressed and dancing as a woman. The behavior involved in the lengger lanang tradition is somewhat reminiscent of transsexuality and cross-dressing behavior. A male lengger dancer would wear traditional female Javanese dance attire, which includes konde (hair bun), kain batik, kemben (torso wrap) or kebaya, selendang (sash), kembang goyang hair jewelry, all in full make up, and they will dance as graceful and glamorous as a woman. According to Javanese beliefs, the lengger idhang (spirit) might be incarnated into a girl or a boy, which would make them a talented and famous lengger dancer. This belief is somewhat the remnant of Javanese Hindu-Buddhist legacy that believe in nitis (reincarnation) cycle. This belief is often used to explain why the effeminate boy is born that way. Just like their female lengger and ronggeng counterpart, a famous male lengger dancer would also become the local celebrity, as the object of admiration, affection, even coveted by men eager to court and date him. In the past, some rich and powerful men might recruit him as a mistress. Because of prevalent culture of shame regarding sexuality, any sexual encounters or emotional relations would be done in such discreet manner.

=== Papuan boy-inseminating rites ===
Ritualized "homosexuality" as a rite of passage transforming boys into adult men has been recorded among Melanesian people of New Guinea, such as the Simbari (or Sambia) people and Etoro people of Papua New Guinea. On the Indonesian side of New Guinea, similar rituals have been recorded as being practiced among the Kimam people in southern Papua province. Anthropologists and other experts report similar practices among other tribes. These practices are age-structured and center on young boys as rites of passage. According to certain beliefs common to these tribes, prepubescent boys are contaminated with female elements through breast feeding and continuous contact with mothers and other female family members. To avoid further female contamination, upon puberty young boys are taken from their mothers and sequestered in communal houses with other boys and unmarried men. These single-gender conditions permit boys to undertake male bonding activities and highly structured rituals, introducing and preparing these boys into proper warrior norms. Thus to wash away female contamination in preparation to become brave warriors, young boys need to ingest semen, regarded among these tribes as the quintessential male essence. The act of ingestion itself takes the form of fellatio or anal intercourse. The inseminators are older members of the tribes, usually uncles, fathers or older brothers of the boys' future wives. The rituals are repeated as needed and cease when the boys reach adulthood, which occurs among these tribes when the boys begin to develop beards and are married off soon after puberty.

== LGBT in Indonesia ==
In Indonesia, effeminate male homosexual or male-to-female transsexual are called banci, bencong or waria (Indonesian: wanita-pria lit: female-male). While lesbians are called lesbi or lines. A rather straight-acting gay male are rarely identified, but if discovered usually they are called homo or gay, while the male homosexual prostitutes are called kucing (lit: cat). Those terms; banci, bencong, kucing and homo does have derogatory meanings, except for waria, gay and lesbian that have gained neutral perception. Name calling and gay bashing usually occur during teenage years, but rarely involves physical abuse and is mainly verbal.

Like in other countries, stereotype of homosexuals occurs quite commonly in Indonesia. Such as they usually took certain line of works such as beauty salon owner or worker, beauticians, make-up artist, to traveling cross-dresser ngamen (street musician) to lewd activities such as a transsexual prostitute. The less effeminate male homosexuals however, are hard to detect and often blend in society.

In traditional Indonesian culture, when a boy or a girl reach puberty, the relations between teenage boys and girls are limited. Traditional mores — especially in villages and rural area — disapprove the teenage courtship, as they may lead to premarital sex. Traditional mores also frowned upon the mixing between unmarried women and men, as they could lead to scandalous fornication. Male bonding and close friendship however, are encouraged. The homoerotic experiences or even homosexual incidents might take place within all male environment, such as asrama or pondok (boarding school, in both religious or secular schools), kost (monthly rent room usually for university students or workers), to military barrack and prison. There are some reports of homosexual incident within these places, however given the pervasive culture of shame, these incidents are often immediately covered as it might stained the reputation of those institutions.

Waria, male to female transgender ritualists, performers and prostitutes, have long played a role in local Indonesian cultures, gay and lesbi did not exist as subject positions before the New Order period, when men and women came to recognise themselves in fleeting depictions of mostly foreign homosexuals and reached the conclusion that a 'gay world' could exist in Indonesia, too. For gay men, this world resides in sites ranging from parks to discos, spas and massage parlors to private residences, 'open' places where men seeking romance and companionship, as well as sex, can congregate at certain times of the day or night. The world of lesbi women, who socialise at home, is differently configured; heterogendered relationships predominate, with a new, waria-like category of persons known as tomboi or hunters (butch lesbian) pairing up with feminine women. The contrast between gays and lesbis reflects the juxtaposition of parallel cultural worlds: if gay men can congregate in parks - and even in their parents' households - relatively unnoticed and unimpeded, this is due in good part to their adherence to a nationally pervasive gender ideology that limits young women's movements, valorises male friendships and frowns upon social mixing between unmarried women and men.

For quite some times, the waria or transsexuals has created a distinct sub-culture in Indonesian social fabrics. Often congregating in beauty salons and prevalent in Indonesian entertainment business, the waria's sub-culture has created their own language, the Bahasa Binan, that often influenced Indonesian hip dialects among youngsters.

The pressure upon gay men or lesbian women often comes from their own family. With family pressure to get married there are mainly two alternatives — either gays and lesbians decide to get married just to please the family or they run away from them. Another difference in homosexual life in Indonesia compared to their western counterparts is gays' and lesbis' commitment to heterosexual marriage; the vast majority of the gay men either planned to marry women or were married already.

== Legal rights ==
The national criminal code does not prohibit private, non-commercial homosexual relations between consenting adults who have reached the age of eighteen years of age.

A national bill to criminalize homosexuality, along with cohabitation, adultery and the practice of witchcraft, failed to be enacted in 2003 and no subsequent bill has been reintroduced.

In 2005, the Indonesian Government gave Aceh province the right to introduce Islamic sharia laws which criminalizes homosexuality, albeit only to Muslim residents. In September 2014, Aceh had passed a sharia-based anti-homosexuality law that punishes anyone caught having gay sex with 100 lashes. The law has been enforced by the end of 2015.

Indonesian same-sex couples and households headed by same-sex couples are not eligible for any of the legal protections available to opposite-sex married couples. The importance in Indonesia for social harmony leads to duties rather than rights to be emphasized, which means that human rights along with homosexual rights are very fragile. Yet, the LGBT community in Indonesia has steadily become more visible and politically active.

Indonesian law allows homosexuality, if it is done in private, non-commercial, and among consenting adults. However, Indonesian law does not recognize gay marriage, civil unions or domestic partnership benefits. Same-sex couples are not eligible to adopt a child in Indonesia. Only married couples consisting of a husband and a wife can adopt.

== See also ==
- LGBT rights in Indonesia
- Bahasa Binan
- Marind people, West Papuan tribe which practices traditional homosexual rituals
