= Gemblak =

Performer in Reog dance

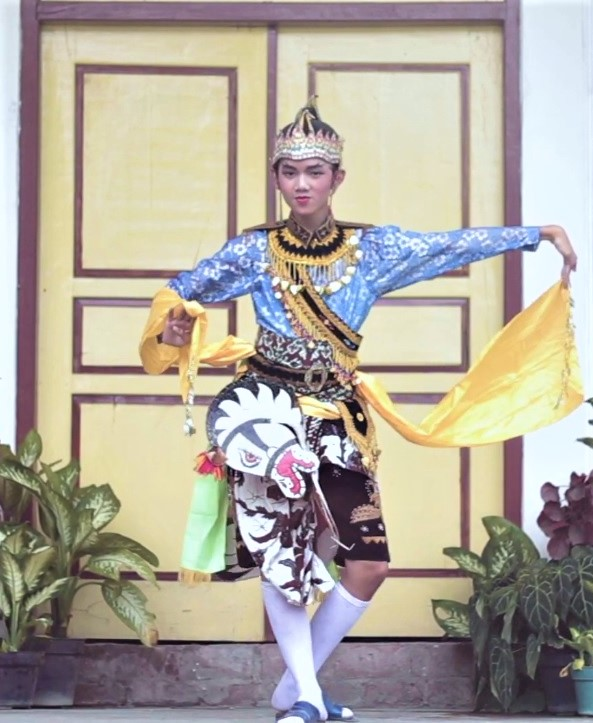
A Gemblak becomes a Jathil dancer in the Reog Ponorogo performance in the 21st century. doc by Muhammad Nur Iqbal UMY

Gemblak (plural gemblakan) among the people of East Java means a "boy lover", a young boy who is kept by an older man either during a period of sexual abstinence (as exemplified by the warok in the traditional dance the Reog) or even during heterosexual marriage.

The role of the gemblak is closely tied to the Reog performance. Since heterosexual relations with women were regarded as sapping the strength of the warok (who leads the dance and functions as master of ceremony, as well as being a "power broker"), he was allowed to have a young boy, usually between 8 and 16, to serve him sexually and play a part in the performance. The gemblak sometimes dresses in female clothing, and is fed and paid for his companionship and work. He often hails from a poor rural family and also does domestic chores for the warok--this, and the social prestige of serving the warok, benefit his family as well. Margaret J. Kartomi, a scholar of Indonesian dance and music, states that the gemblak is a transvestite and thus "symbolizes the unity of the cosmos". According to J. B. M. De Lyon, the gemblak is also a symbol of fertility, and was sometimes brought to the bridal bed of a newly-wed couple. Clara van Groenendael describes a ritual horse dance in which the gemblakan (or jathilan) also played a part.

== See also ==
- Homosexuality in Indonesia
