= Sisingaan =

Indonesian traditional lion dance

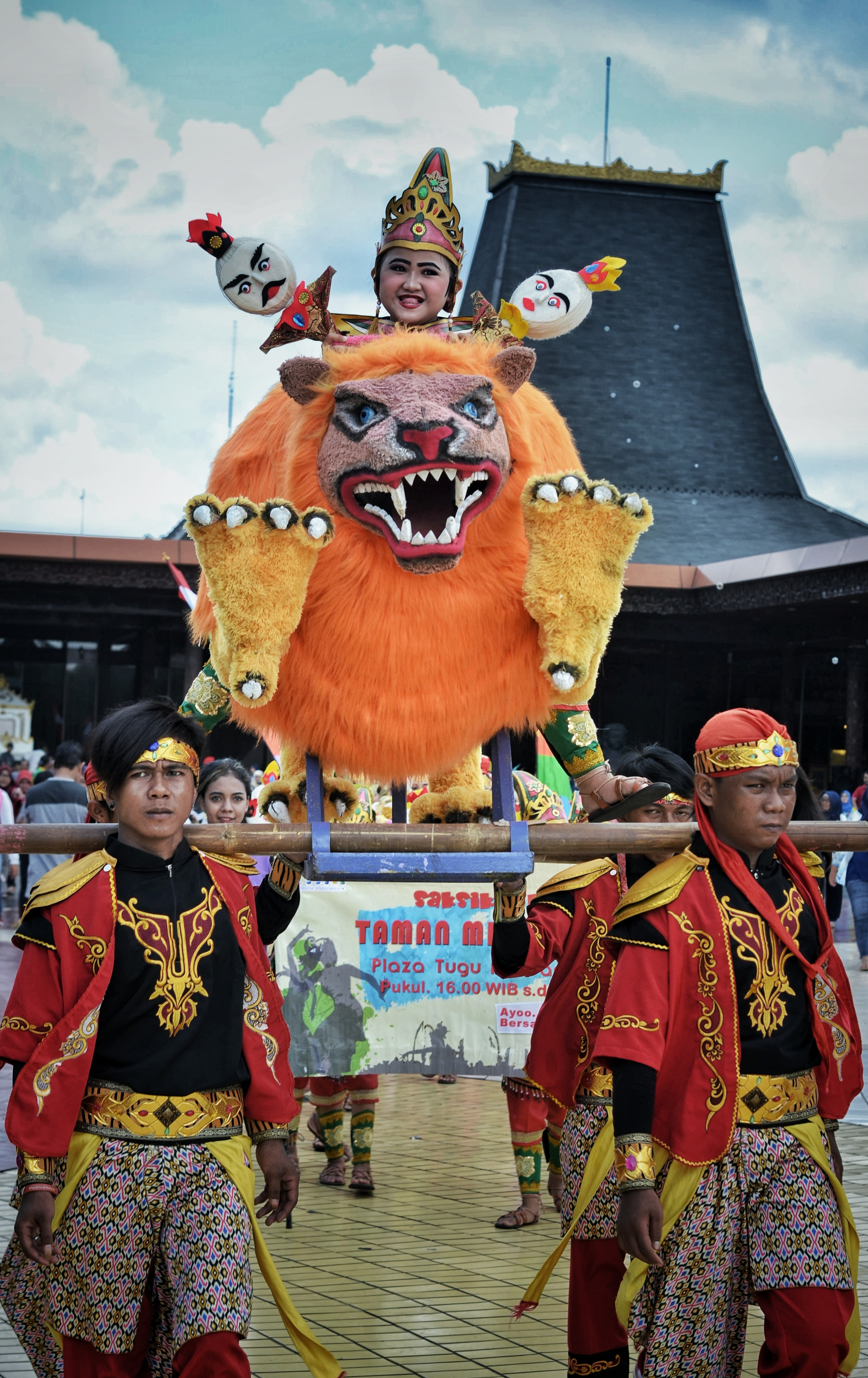
- Sisingaan dance performance in Taman Mini Indonesia Indah, Jakarta
- Genre: Lion dance
- Instrument(s): kendang, kempul, goong, suling, tarompét
- Inventor: Sundanese
- Origin: Indonesia

Sisingaan, also known as Gotong Singa, Singa Ungkleuk, Singa Depok, Kuda Ungkleuk, Pergosi, or Odong-odong, is a traditional Sundanese lion dance that originated in Subang, West Java, Indonesia. This lion dance performance is marked by a form of an ark or palanquin that resembles a lion. The lion ark or lion-shaped effigy is carried by a group of dancers who perform various attractions accompanied by traditional music. This dance is usually performed to celebrate a child's circumcision ceremony, where the child is carried on the lion around the kampung (village).

== Etymology ==
In Sundanese language the term sisingaan means "imitation lion", "playing the lion" or "lion play". This refers to the form of a lion-like effigy that is the main part of the show.

== Form ==
Unlike other lion dances however, this lion dance is quite different. It uses lion-like statue or an effigy doll that resembles a lion in couchant (lying down) position, being held in a palanquin-like structure by four or two men with bamboo rods. The lion statue is ridden by the children who have been circumcised, carried away and held high by men in certain dance movements, sometimes involving acrobatics. The dance is accompanied with a traditional music troupe consists of musicians playing musical instruments; including kendang (drum), kempul, gong, suling bamboo flute and trumpet.

== History ==
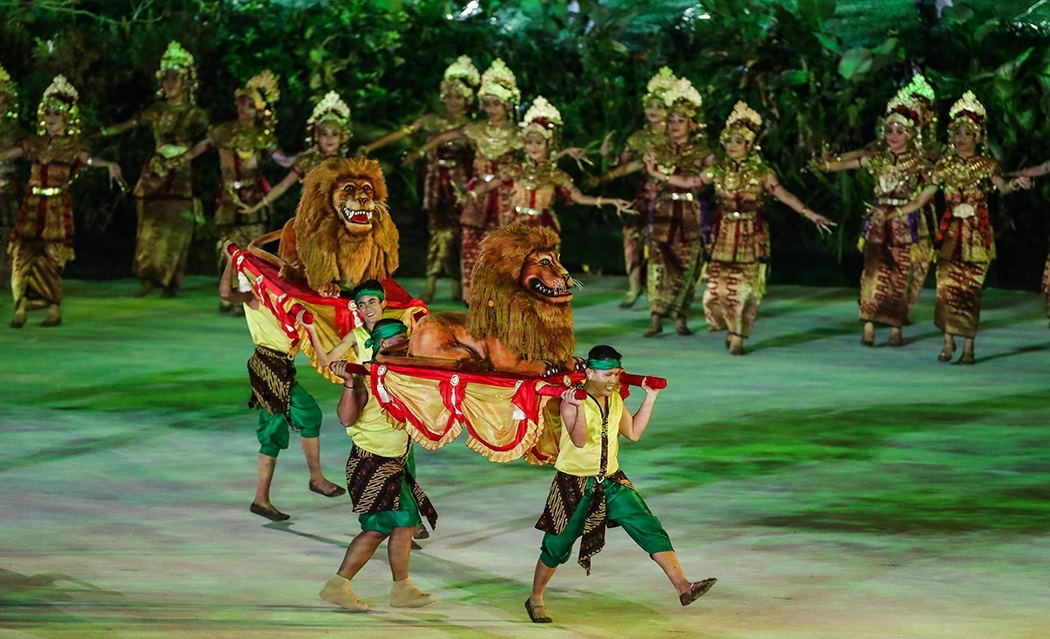
Sisingaan lion dance performance during 2018 Asian Games opening ceremony.

At first, the Sundanese people of Subang had an art called "oesungan" which they carried in the form of birds, deer, stealth on a stretcher. At that time there was no stretcher in the form of a lion like this time. Then The Sisingaan was created around 1975 by Sundanese artists, because remembering the arrival of the reog Ponorogo art to the city which was brought by urbanites from Ponorogo.

After the Sundanese artists discussed with the Reog artists who were very different from the Reog Dog-Dog Sundanese, that reog from East Java attracted more attention and had philosophical values and historical records against Dutch colonialism, an art was created that was able to show the distinctive identity of Subang from the ideas of the artist.

Sisingaan was inspired by the Reog series in East Java, which tells of the joy of the journey of King Singa Barong's bodyguards from the kingdom of Lodaya to the Daha kingdom. Even though the king was known to be cruel and arrogant, the guards were always loyal to carry the litter that King Singa Barong slept with.

In addition, as a symbol of the resistance of the people of Subang against Dutch arbitrariness, which is depicted as a lion in the VOC symbol, it is intended as a calming historical learning education for students.

At first, the Sundanese people of Subang had an art called "oesungan" which they carried in the form of birds, deer, stealth on a stretcher. At that time there was no stretcher in the form of a lion like this time

== Gallery ==
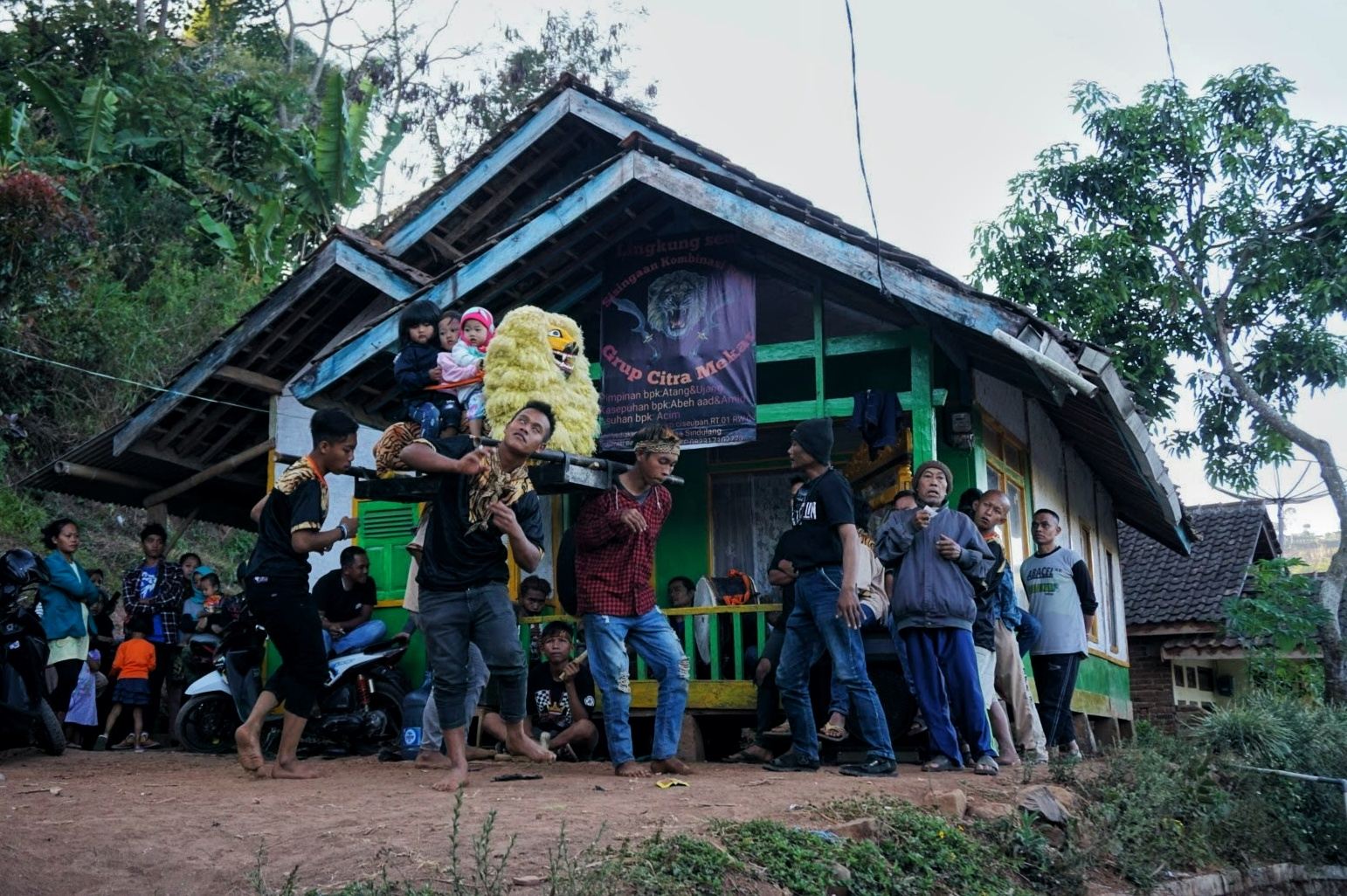
Sisingaan dance performance in a village.

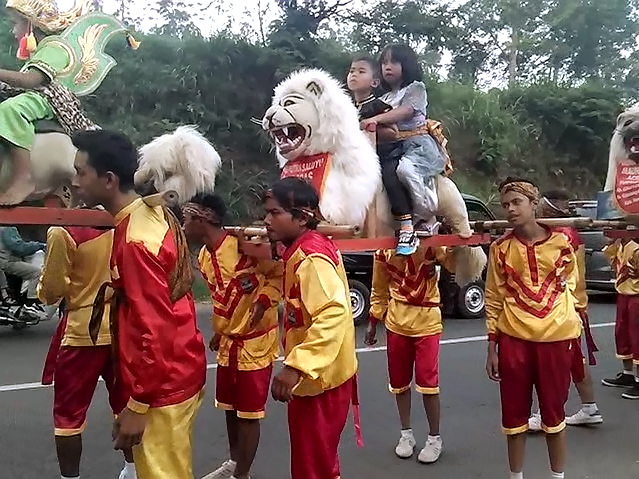
Sisingaan dance with kids riding the lion effigy.

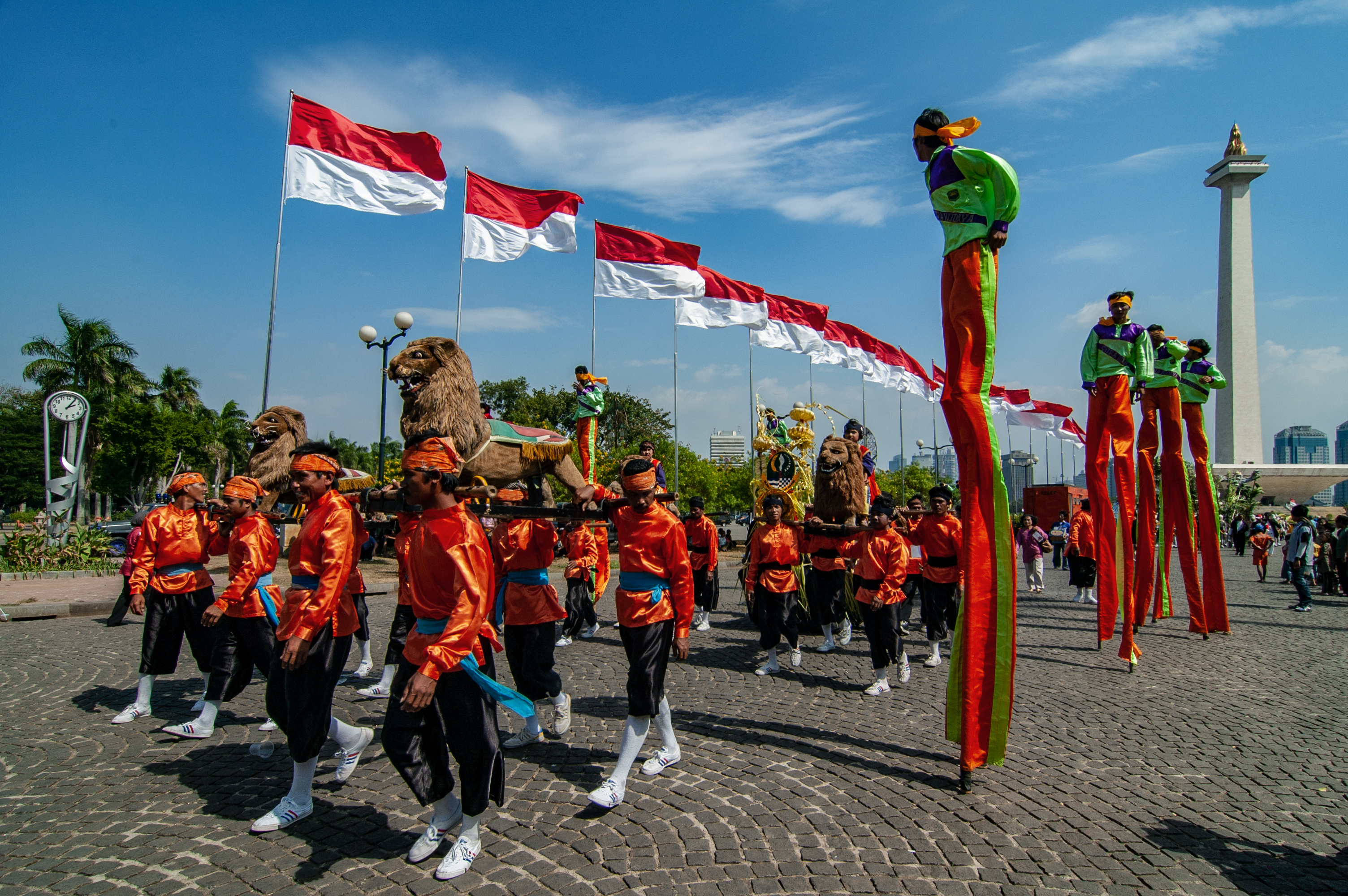
Sisingaan lion dance parade during Independence day parade in 2008 Merdeka Square, Jakarta.

== See also ==
- Reog
- Barong
- Dances in Indonesia
