= Kuda Lumping =

Indonesian traditional dance

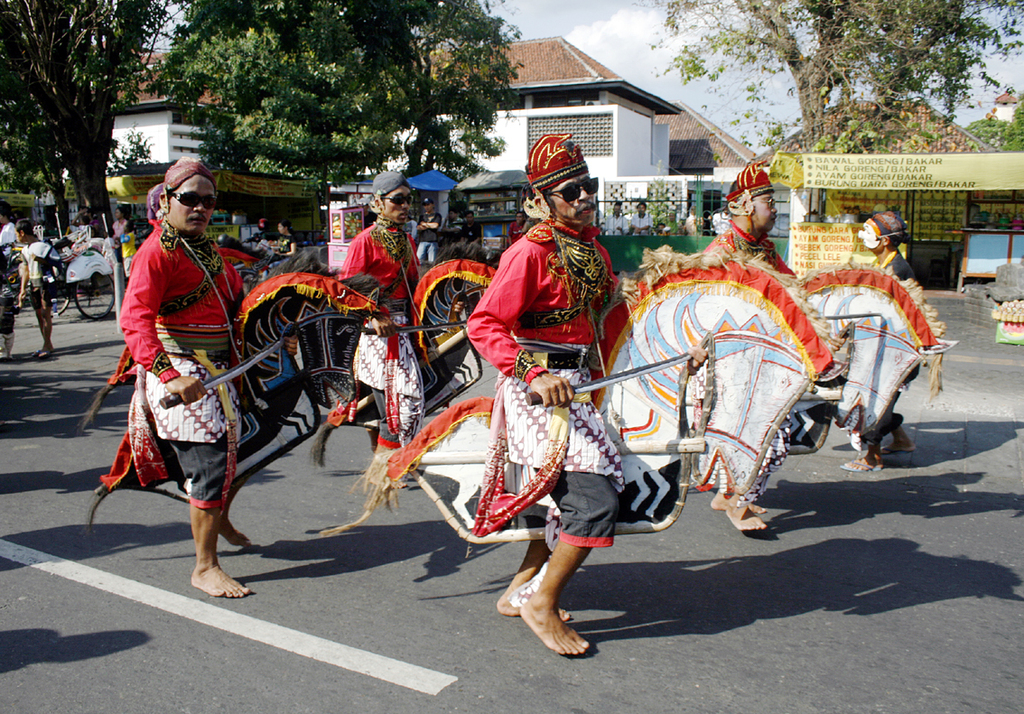
- Kuda Lumping dance during a festival in Yogyakarta, Indonesia
- Native name: ꦗꦫꦤ꧀ꦏꦺꦥꦁ (Javanese); Tari Kuda Lumping (Indonesian)
- Genre: Traditional dance
- Instrument(s): Gamelan, Gong, Kendhang, Angklung
- Inventor: Javanese
- Origin: Indonesia

Kuda Lumping (Javanese: ꦗꦫꦤ꧀ꦏꦺꦥꦁ, Jaran Kepang or Jathilan, Indonesian: Kuda Lumping or Kuda Kepang, English: Flat Horse) is a traditional Javanese dance originated from Ponorogo, East Java, Indonesia depicting a group of horsemen. Dancers "ride" horses made from woven bamboo and decorated with colorful paints and cloth. Generally, the dance portrays troops riding horses, but another type of Kuda Lumping performance also incorporates trances and magic tricks. When the "possessed" dancer is dancing in trance conditions, he can display unusual abilities, such as eating glass and resistance to the effects of whipping or hot coals.

Although the dance is native to Java, Indonesia, it is also performed by the Javanese communities diaspora in Suriname, Malaysia and Singapore, popularly known as Kuda Kepang.

== Origin ==
The Kuda Lumping is originated in Java island, Indonesian. Two main hypotheses have been proposed. The first suggests that Kuda Lumping may have arisen out of Diponegoro's war against the Dutch colonial forces, as a ritual reenactment of battles. While the second theory suggests that it is based on Mataram-era troops riding against the Dutch.

However, Kuda Lumping is known under different names in different areas of Indonesia. Kuda Lumping is the most common name in West Java, in Central Java it is known as Jaran Kepang or Jathilan in East Java, while in Bali, it is known as Sang Hyang Jaran. In Balinese Sanghyang dance refer to the type of dance involving trance by spirit identified as hyang.

== Performance ==
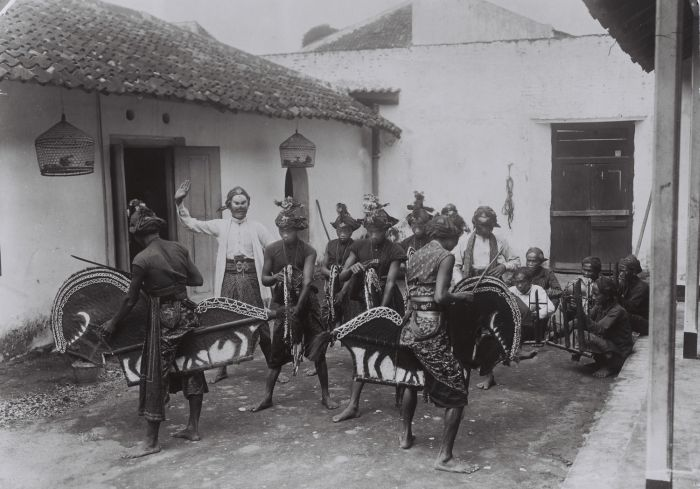
Dancers on stick horses and musicians participating in a Kuda Kepang game in a courtyard of a private house in Java, between 1900 and 1940

Kuda Lumping may be performed in celebration of a special event, such as a boy's circumcision or rite of passage. It may also be performed as entertainment, in a busker style. It is generally performed in a cordoned-off area, with the audience separated from the dancers.

Kuda Lumping is traditionally performed by a group of men drawn from the local community; this group can number from two to eight. The performers mount rattan horses and dance while traditional instruments such as the angklung, gongs, and dog-dog drums are played. This portion of the performance ends when a dancer enters a trance, which is traditionally said to be caused by spirit possession. In Sang Hyang Jaran, the audience may participate by forming a chorus and singing.

During their trances, the dancers may pretend to eat grass or drink water, while another performer or shaman uses a whip to direct them. In some performances, dancers may walk on coals or eat glass or fire, which can cause various injuries. The dancers also interact with the audience; in busker performances, they may ask for money. In some areas, the dancers serve as oracles to deliver prophecies. After awakening from their trances, performers claim not to remember anything done while performing.

In East Java, the similar dance is called Jathilan, and is a part of Reog Ponorogo performance. A Jathil is a youthful, handsome horseman riding horses made of woven bamboo. Unlike common jaran kepang, however, jathil never performed trance dances and stunts such as eating glass or walking on fiery charcoal. Traditionally jathilan dance was performed by gemblakan, today Jathil usually performed by female dancers.

== Equipment ==
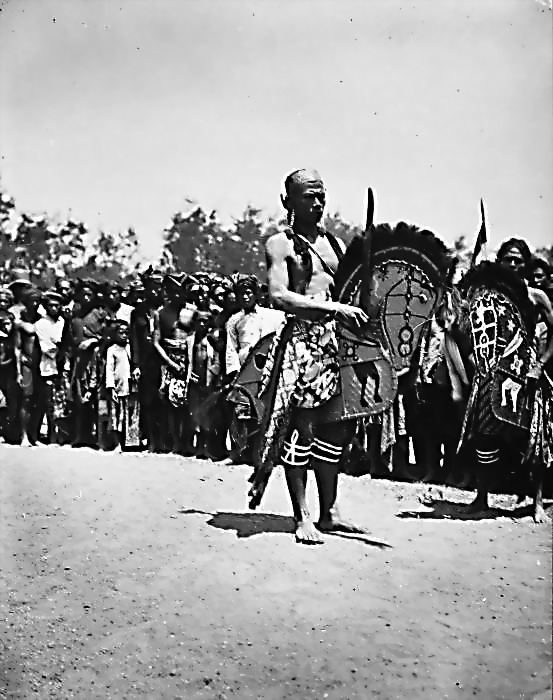
A Kuda Lumping dancer in Mataram, Lombok (1922)

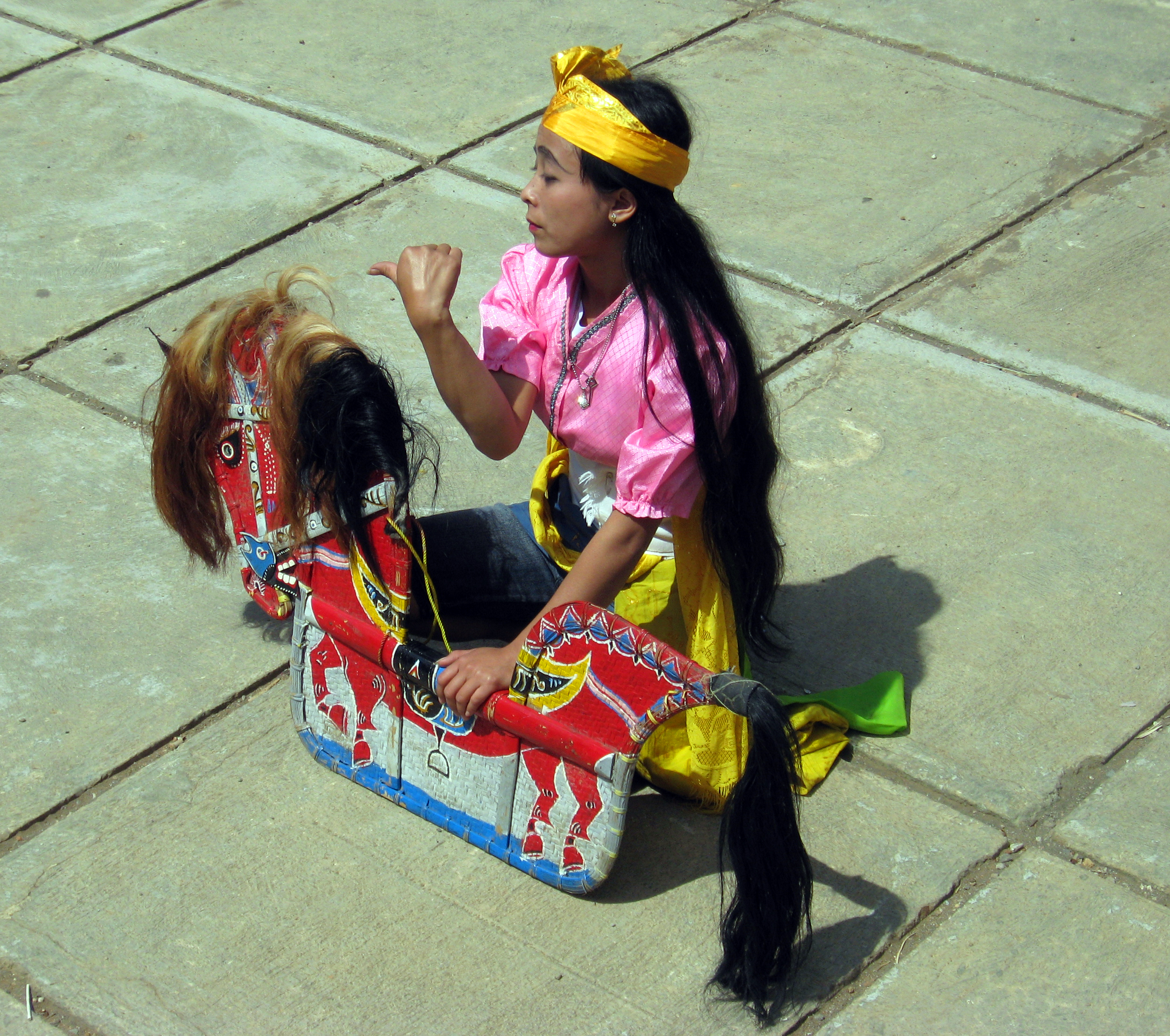
A female dancer showing her rattan horse

Dancers perform using rattan horses, generally colourful and decorated with beads and sequins. Adults use larger horses than children. Children's horses may also be cut from bamboo mats. Performers wear colorful clothes and may occasionally dress as soldiers. The costume may also include small bells strung around the ankle. In comparison to the shaman, the dancers' costumes are more feminized.

== Symbolism ==
Henry Spiller suggests that Kuda Lumping represents spiritual power and masculine virility, which is "wild and uncontrolled ... yet ultimately a good thing". Max Richter notes that the erratic movements of the "feminized" dancers may "draw on ideas about the subordinate 'irrational' female", while the slower, more deliberate movements of the shaman "may be seen as masculine and potent". However, he considers this secondary to the conflicts of science versus magic and good versus bad. He also notes that it serves as a way for young boys to release energy in a non-violent manner. These, of course, are the interpretations of Western academics and do not reflect the views and intentions of the native dancers.

== Reception ==
Kuda Lumping is widely popular, but individual observer opinions vary. Some view it as being related to the evil spirit, while others see it as being a good influence. A shift in meaning, from a mainly spiritual ritual to entertainment, has been noted.

Kuda Lumping has been used as the basis for a dangdut song of the same name.

In August 2025, three men pleaded guilty in the Syariah Court in Batu Pahat, Johor, Malaysia, for charges under Section 3 of the Syariah Criminal Offences Enactment of Johor 1997 of incorrect acts of worship (syirik) after a video of the men performing Kuda Kepang went viral. The Johor Mufti later added that the dance can be preserved due to its cultural heritage but it cannot compromise on Islamic principles.

== See also ==
- Javanese culture
- Kejawèn (Javanism)
- Reog
- Sanghyang (Sacred Balinese dance)
