= Reog =

Indonesian traditional dance

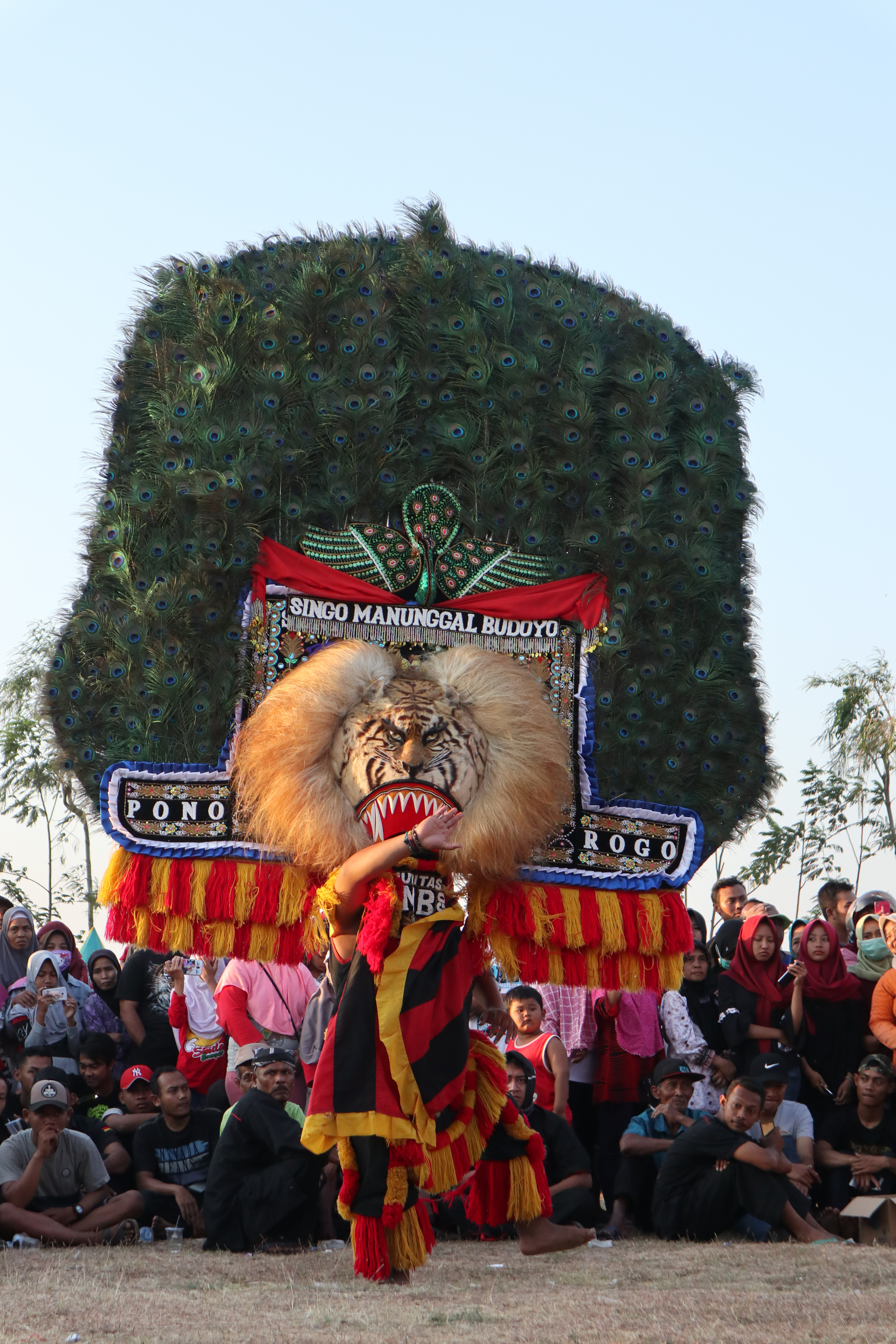
- Reog dance performance in Ponorogo, Eastern Java
- Instrument: Gamelan
- Origin: East Java (Ponorogo), Indonesia

Reog Ponorogo performing art
- UNESCO Intangible Cultural Heritage
- Country: Indonesia
- Reference: 01969
- Region: Asia and the Pacific

Inscription history
- Inscription: 2024 (19th session)
- List: Need of Urgent Safeguarding

Reog or Réyog (Javanese: ꦫꦺꦪꦺꦴꦒ꧀) is a traditional Indonesian dance in an open arena that serves as folk entertainment and contains some magical elements. The main dancer is a lion-headed person with a peacock feather decoration, accompanied by several masked dancers and Kuda Lumping. Reog is one of the performing arts from the northwestern region of East Java and Ponorogo is the region where Reog originated. The city gate of Ponorogo is decorated with warok and gemblak, two characters who were present at the time when Reog is performed. Reog is one aspect of Indonesian culture that remains firmly linked with mystical elements and mysticism.

In 2013, Reog Ponorogo tradition was recognized as National Intangible Cultural Heritage of Indonesia by the Indonesia Ministry of Education and Culture.

On 3 December 2024, Reog Ponorogo performing art was inscribed on the UNESCO list of Intangible cultural heritage in need of urgent safeguarding.

== Etymology ==
In the book of "Pedoman Dasar Kesenian Reog Ponorogo dalam Pentas Budaya Bangsa" published by the Ponorogo Regional Government in 1993, it is stated that the words reog or reyog is Javanese in origin. It comes from the Javanese riyeg or riyet means 'noisy or crowded'.

== History ==
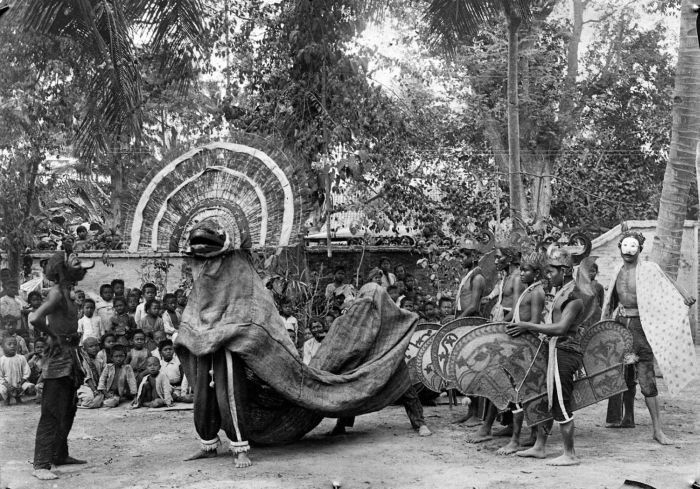
Reog dancers performance in Ponorogo, Dutch East Indies, c. 1920.

The dance describe Klono Sewandono the king of Ponorogo on his journey to Kediri to seek the hand of the Princess Songgo Langit. On his journey he was attacked by a vicious monster called Singo Barong, a mythical lion with peacock on its head. Historians trace the origin of Reog Ponorogo as the satire on the incompetence of Majapahit rulers during the end of the empire. It describe the innate Ponorogo liberty and its opposition on centralist Majapahit rule. The lion represent the king of Majapahit while the peafowl represent the queen, it was suggested that the king was incompetent and always being controlled by his queen. The beautiful, youthful and almost effeminate horsemen describe the Majapahit cavalry that have lost their manliness.

In society there is another version of the origin of the Reog. History of Reog Arts began with the revolt of Ki Ageng, a man of Majapahit Kingdom in the 15th century, where at that time the Majapahit Kingdom was under the rule of the King of Kertabhumi Bhre, the last Majapahit Kingdom. Ki Ageng Kutu, who held wrath against the corrupt behavior of his King, saw that the powers of the Majapahit Kingdom soon would end. He left the Kingdom and founded a college of martial arts in hope of raising seeds which can be held as under. Aware that the army was not able to compete with the Majapahit army, political messages of Ki Ageng Kutu were submitted through the performances of Reog. Ki Ageng Kutu utilized performance of Reog to build resistance to the Royal Society. In art performances Reog was shown the head of a lion-shaped mask called "Singo Barong", King of the forest that became a symbol of Kertabhumi, and it plugged up to peacock feathers to resemble a giant fan that symbolises the strong influence of the governing Chinese pronunciation of peers over all. Jathilan, played by a group of dancers a gemblak horses-shaped became a symbol of the power of the Kingdom of Majapahit in contrast with the power of warok. Red clown mask that became the symbol for Ki Ageng Kutu, alone and support the weight of the mask Singo Barong that reaches over 50 kg using only his teeth. Ki Ageng Kutu's Reog popularity eventually led to Bhre Kertabhumi taking action and attacking Kutu's college, the rebellion by warok was quickly overcome, and the college is prohibited to continue teaching about warok. But the disciples of Ki Ageng Kutu continue secretly. However, the performance of Reog itself is allowed to stage performances because it has become popular among the people but the storyline having a groove in which the characters of new added folktale of Ponorogo, for example like Klono Sewandono, Dewi Songgolangit, and Sri Genthayu.

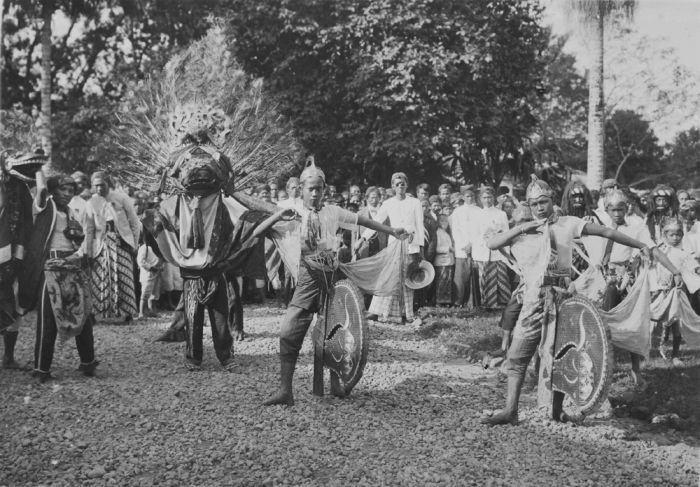
Reog dancers performance in Java, Dutch East Indies, between 1920 and 1930

Reog Ponorogo dancers traditionally performed in a trance state. Reog Ponorogo displays the traditional Kejawen Javanese spiritual teaching. Next to physical requirement, the dancers—especially the Warok—required to follow strict rules, rituals and exercises, both physical and spiritual. One of the requirement is abstinence, warok is prohibited to indulged and involved in sexual relationship with women, yet having sex with boy age eight to fifteen is allowed. The boy lover is called Gemblak and usually kept by Warok in their household under the agreement and compensation to the boy's family. Warok can be married with a woman as their wife, but they may kept a gemblak too. This led to Warok-Gemblakan relationship that similar to pederastic tradition of ancient Greece. Anybody who is in touch with the traditional way of life in Ponorogo, knows that there are these older men called warok who, instead of having sex with their wives, have sex with younger boys. What Warok and Gemblak did is homosexual act, yet they never identify themself as homosexuals.

Many Warok and Gemblak were massacred by Islamic groups during the anti-communist Indonesian killings of 1965–1966, their heads placed on pikes for public display. Today the Warok-Gemblakan practice is discouraged by local religious authorities and being shunned through public moral opposition. As a result today Reog Ponorogo performance rarely features Gemblak boys to perform as Jathil horsemen; their position were replaced by girls. Although today this practice might probably still survive and be done in discreet manner.

Today, Reog Ponorogo is often held on festive special occasions, such as the Islamic holiday of Eid al-Fitr, anniversary of Ponorogo Regency, Independence day carnival on 17 August, and the opening ceremony of sporting events. Today, reog troupe performances can be seen in various countries brought by Indonesian workers. Such as in the United States (Singo Lodoyo Washington DC), South Korea (Singo Mudho Korea), Taiwan (Singo Barong Taiwan), Australia (Singo Sarjono), naval expedition Indonesia (Reog Dewaruci), Germany, Japan, Hong Kong, Malaysia (Sardulo Gugah Ponorogo, Sri Wahyuni, Gamalasari).

== Performance ==
Reog is a traditional dance that became the main identity for Ponorogo Regency. Reog National Festival is held every year along with the anniversary of Ponorogo regency and the Grebeg Suro celebration. Reog dance is also staged nightly on the full moon in Paseban, Ponorogo town square. Reog tells the story about the struggle of a prince who will propose to a beautiful princess. Reog Ponorogo tells the story of a mythical battle between the King of Ponorogo and the magical lion-like creature called Singo Barong.

=== Singo Barong mask (Dadak Merak) ===
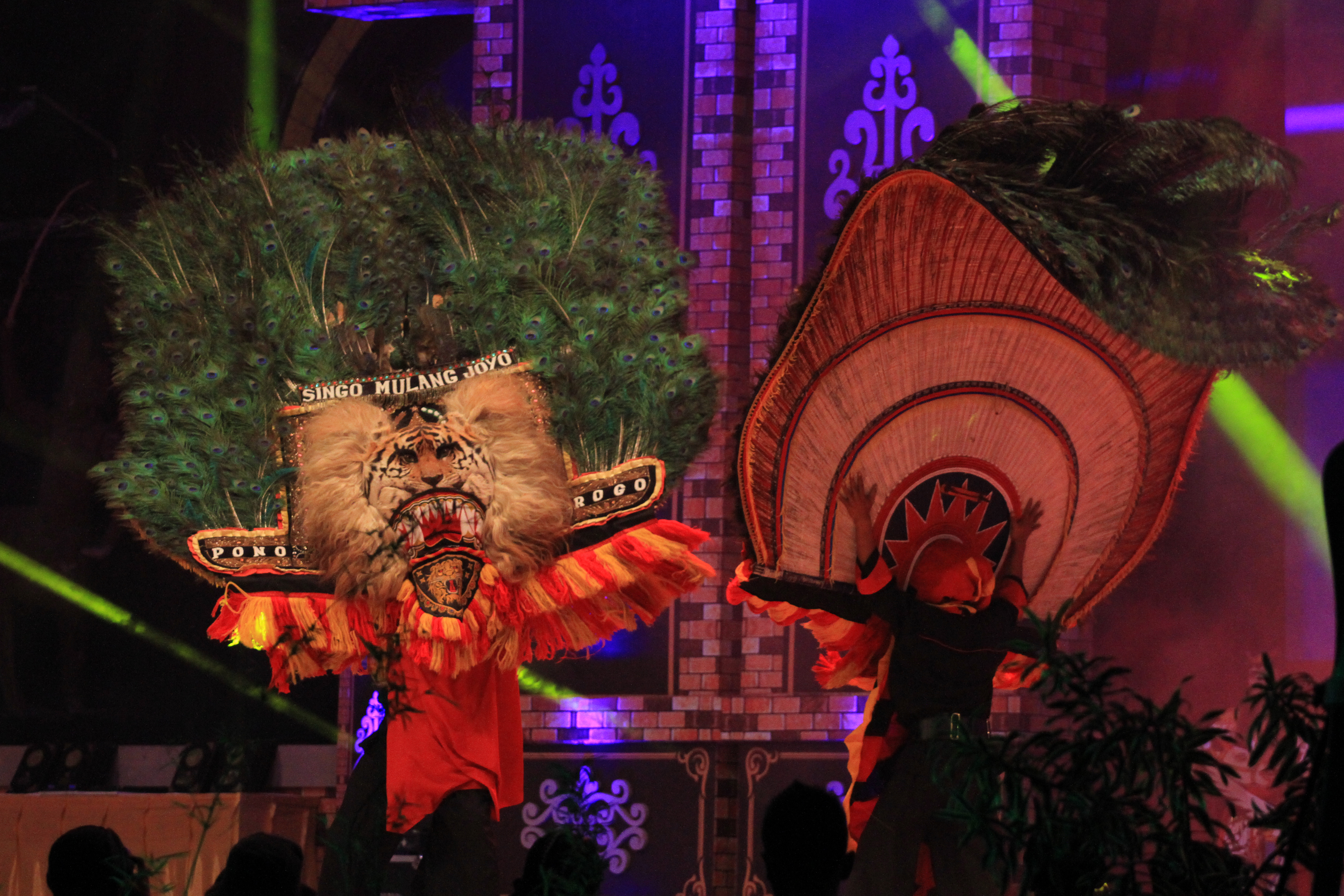
Singo Barong performance at Festival Reog Nasional in Ponorogo, East Java, Indonesia

The Reog dance of Ponorogo involves a lion figure known as the singo barong. Singo Barong is a large mask usually made from a tiger's or leopard's head skin, on the mask is a large fan adorned with real peafowl feathers. The Singo Barong mask is notoriously heavy and the dancer of the Singo Barong has to carry the mask of about 30–40 kg (66–88 lb) in weight and is supported by the strength of their teeth.

A single dancer, or warok, carries the heavy lion mask by his teeth. He is credited with supernatural abilities and strength. The warok may also carry an adolescent boy or girl on its head. When carrying an adolescent boy or girl on his head, the Reog dancer holds weight of up to 100 kg (220 lb) in total. Holding the heavy big mask by biting, the warok relies on the strength of his jaws, neck and shoulder muscles. The great mask spans over 2.5 m (8 ft 2 in) with genuine tiger skin and real peacock feathers. It has gained international recognition as the world's largest mask.

=== Performers ===
The leading figures in Reog Ponorogo performance include:

1. Klono Sewandono, A man in regal attire wearing a mask with a proud and pompous dance and plays the role as the King of Ponorogo
2. Bujang Ganong are rough youthful men wearing red masks, they perform acrobatic dances and sometimes also involve trances.
3. Jathil, the youthful and handsome men riding horses made of weaved bamboo, similar to the Kuda Lumping dance. Today, Jathil is usually performed by female dancers.
4. Warok, plays as the Singo Barong, the mythical creature. The one who is allowed to perform this dance is called warok. A warok is the honorary title of the local hero or strongman of the village who possesses both exceptional spiritual and physical strength. The dance itself is a demonstration of physical strength.

Reog Ponorogo usually consists of three sets of dances; each dance is performed by several dancers:

1. The first dance is the opening dance, performed by Bujang Ganong, male dancers who wear black costumes. The costume describes rough men with intimidating moustaches and other masculine symbols.
2. The second dance is the Jaran Kepang dance performed by Jathil; it is originally performed by a gemblak, a handsome and youthful teenage boy wearing colourful costumes. Today female dancers usually play this role.
3. The third dance is the main attraction of the show; it is performed by all the Reog dancers. The warok as the main male dancer, wearing the large and heavy lion mask, dances in the centre of the stage while the other dancers dance around him. To demonstrate the warok's extraordinary strength, the Jathil rides on top of the lion mask and is carried around.
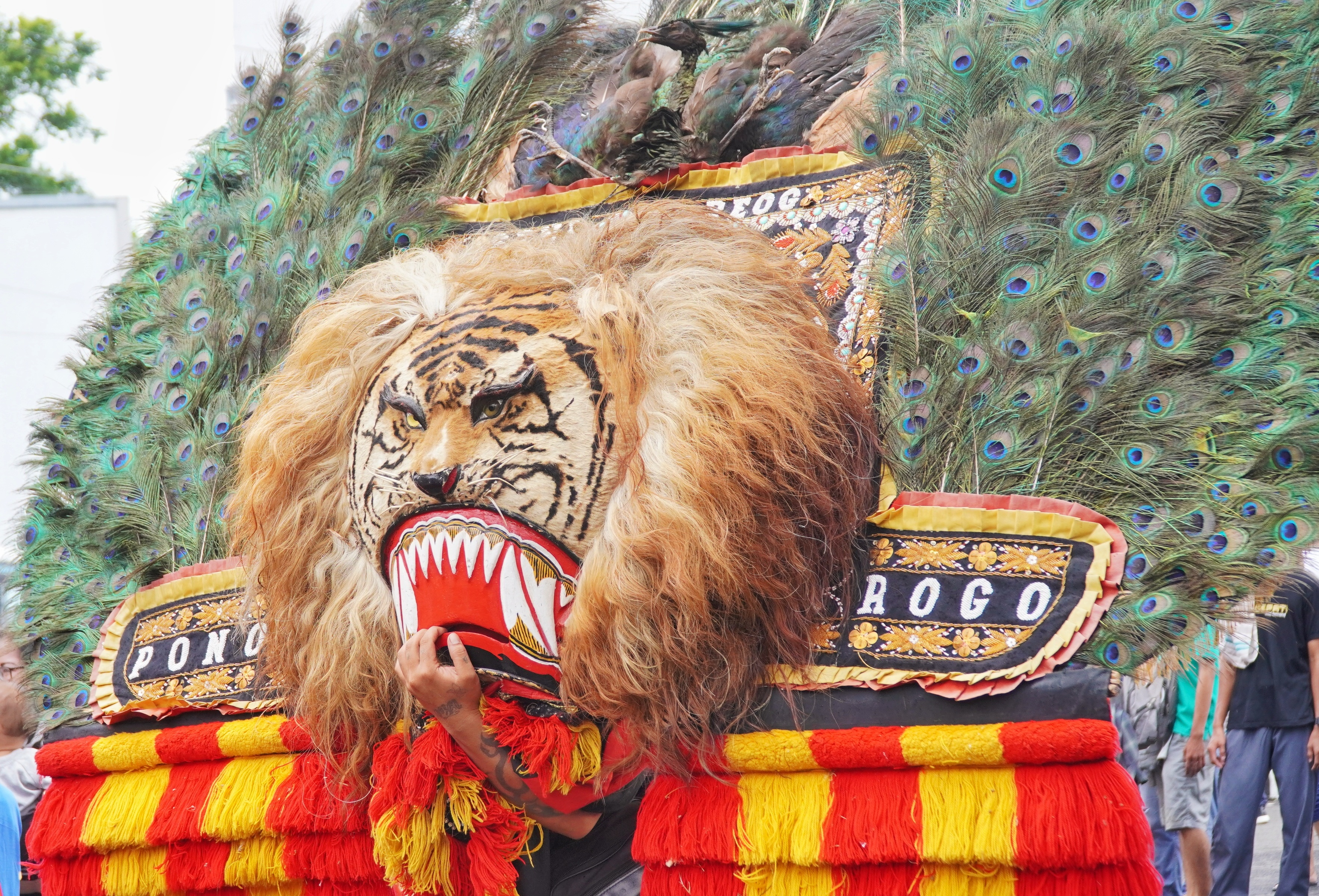
Singo Barong

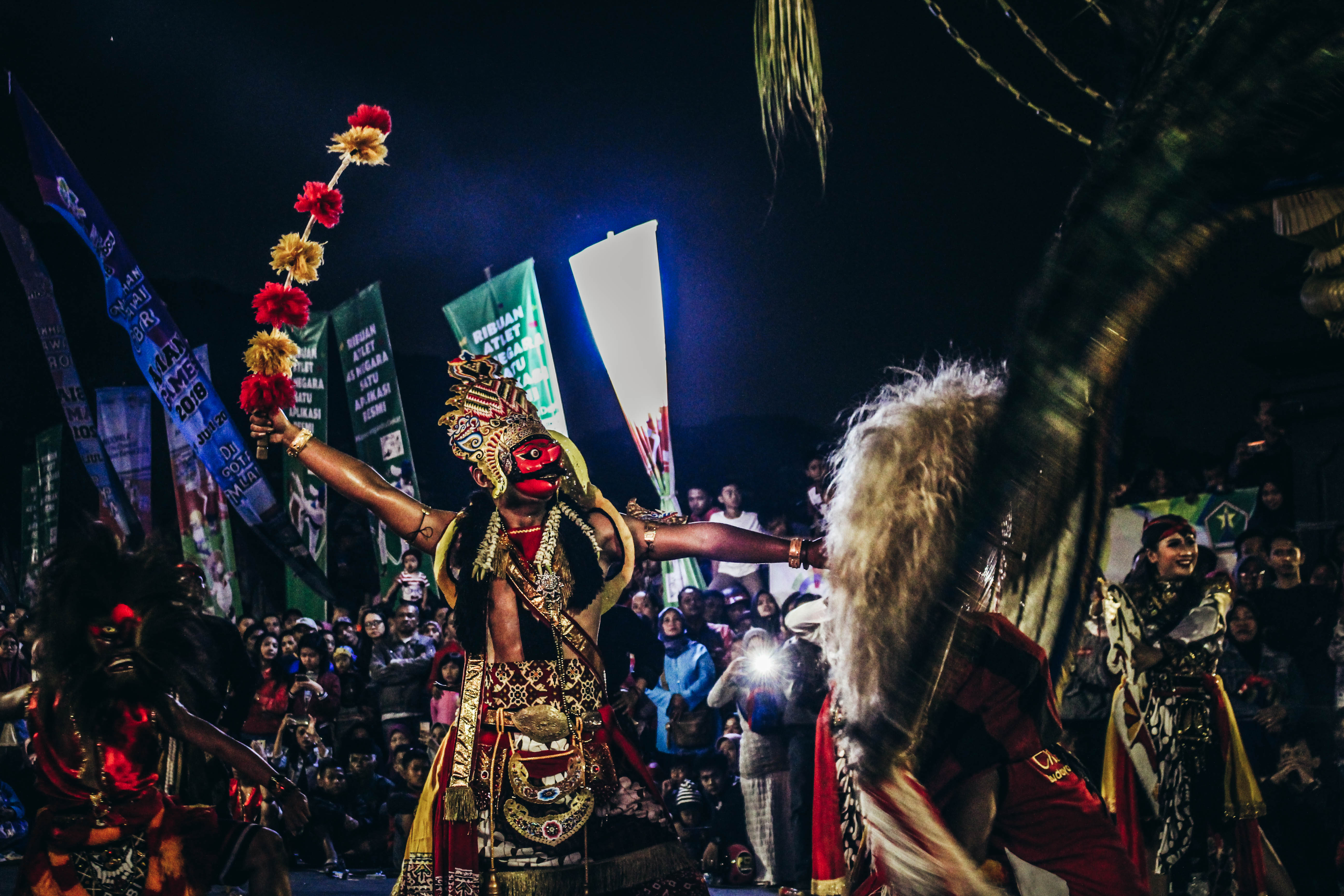
Klono Sewandono

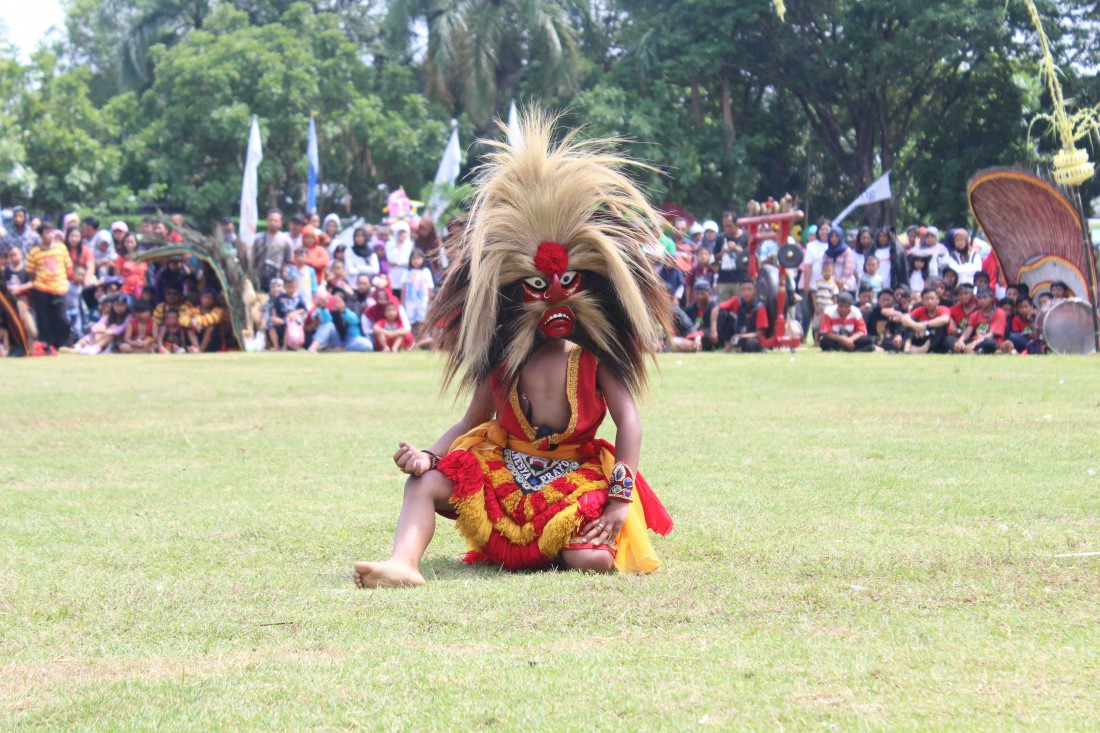
Bujang Ganong

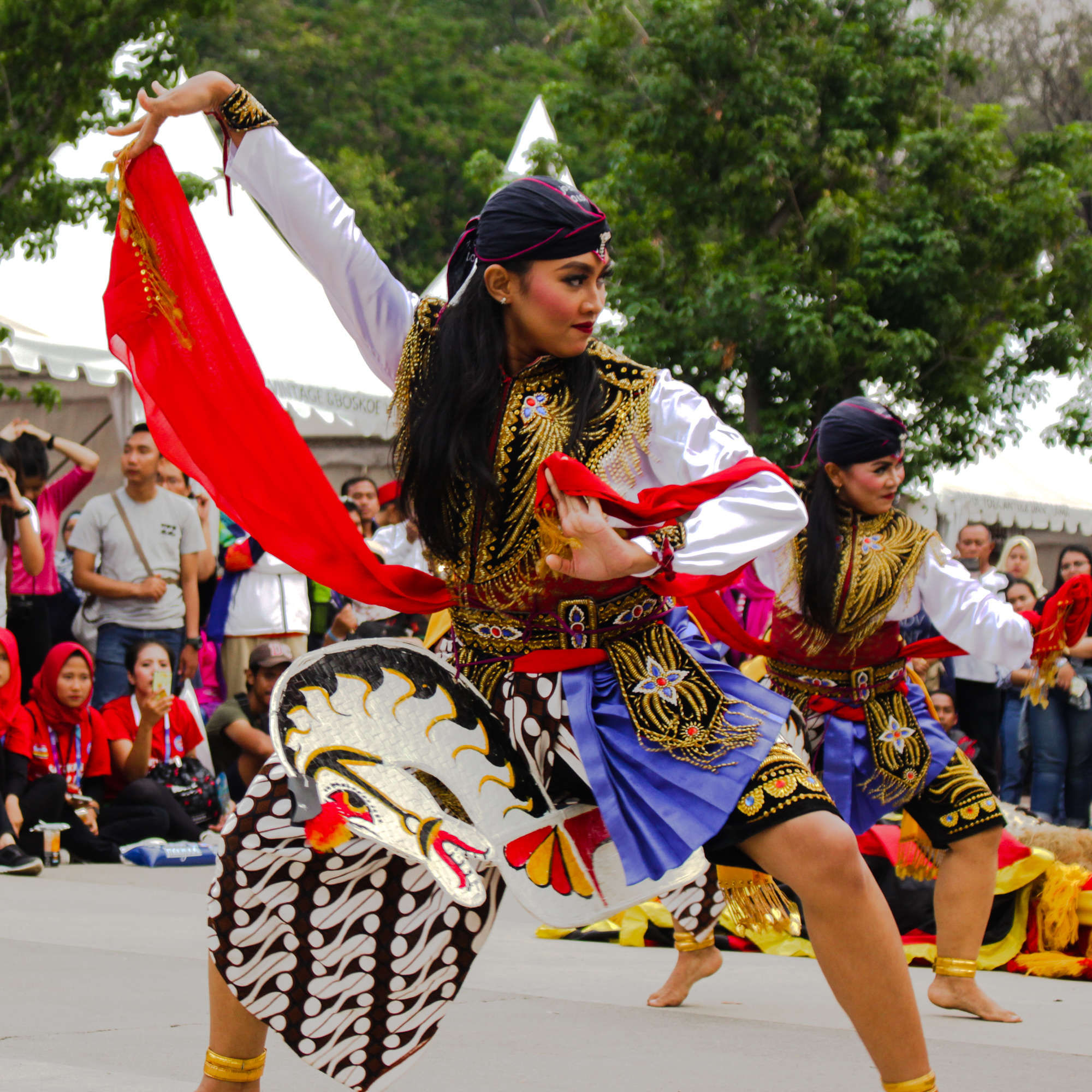
Jathil

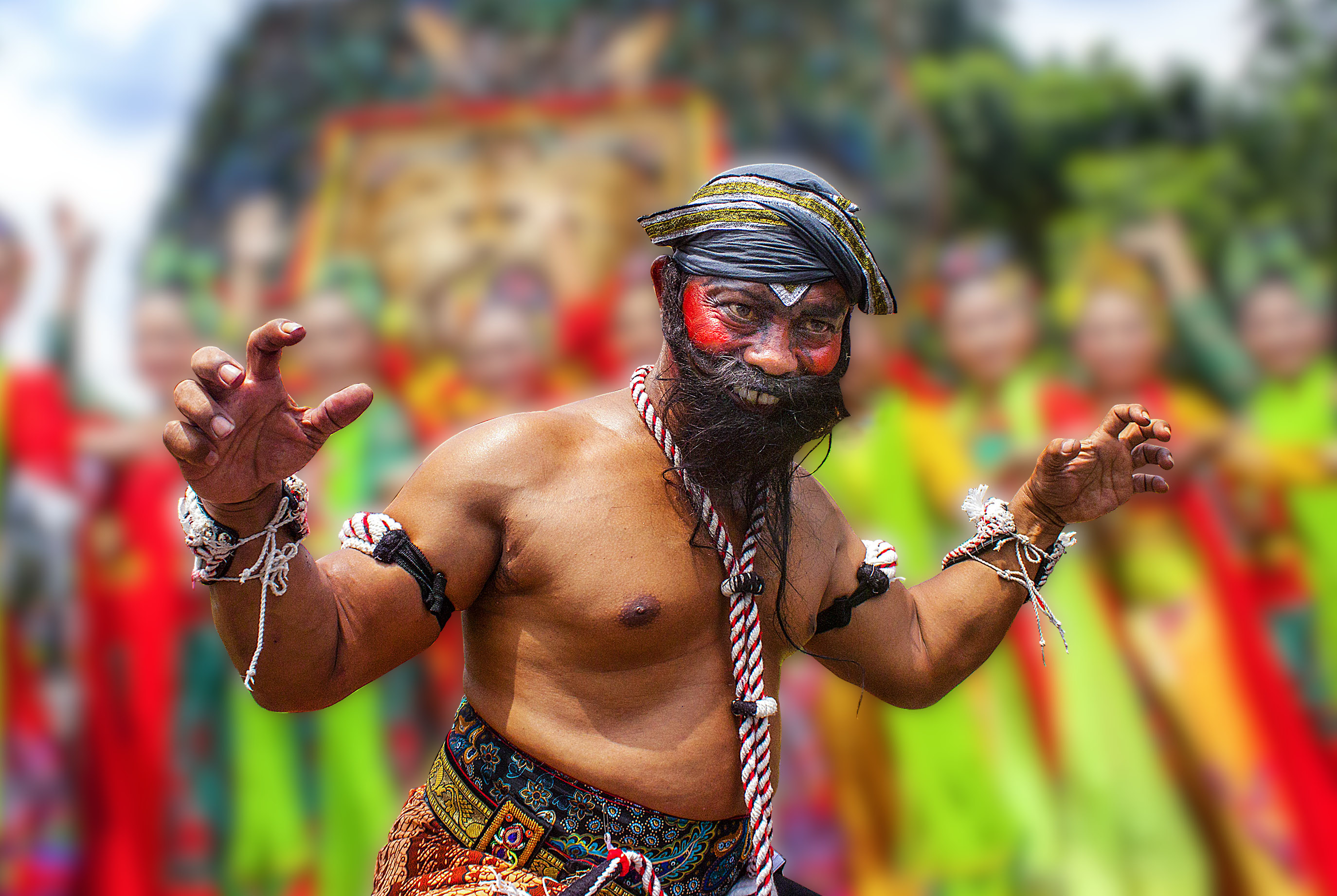
Warok

== Controversy ==
Malaysian Barongan is similar to Reog Ponorogo but with an Islamic element injected into it. The controversy arose because the Singo Barong mask on the official website of Ministry of Tourism, Arts and Culture of Malaysia contained the words "Malaysia" on it and recognized as a legacy of Muslim Javanese communities in Malaysia especially in the district of Muar, Johor. The origins and cultural ownership of the Reog dance have been the subject of a dispute and controversy between the neighboring countries of Indonesia and Malaysia, whose ethnic, cultural and religious histories overlap and share many similarities. Mostly because there is numerous descendants of Javanese immigrants in Malaysia, some who have been serving with Sultan of Malacca, before moving together with the Sultan, especially in Johor state to form Johor-Riau Sultanate. And some of the immigrants brought many Javanese artforms such as the aforementioned barongan, Javanese-style wayang kulit, and kuda kepang. Thousands of Reog artist had a demonstration at the Malaysian Embassy in Jakarta. To avoid further controversy with Indonesia, all promotional revival on Barongan have been discontinued by the government of Malaysia, contributing to further decline of Barongan in Malaysia. However, the Malaysian government continue to promote other ethnic cultures like the Portuguese-Eurasian festival of San Pedro.

== See also ==
- Barong (mythology)
- Kuda lumping
- Javanese dance
- Sisingaan
