= Ponorogo Regency =

Regency in East Java, Indonesia

Ponorogo Regency Kabupaten Ponorogo
- Regency

Other transcription(s)
  - Javanese: Pånårågå (Gêdrig) ڤاناراڮا (Pégon) ꦥꦤꦫꦒ (Hånåcåråkå)
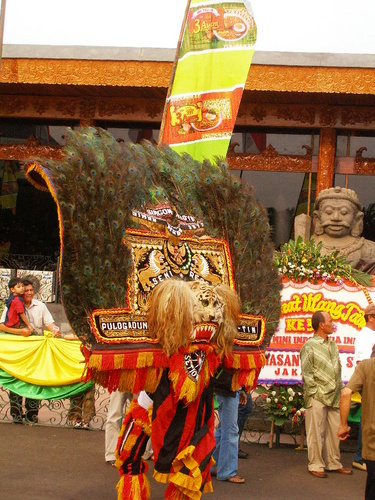
- A demonstration of Reog Ponorogo.

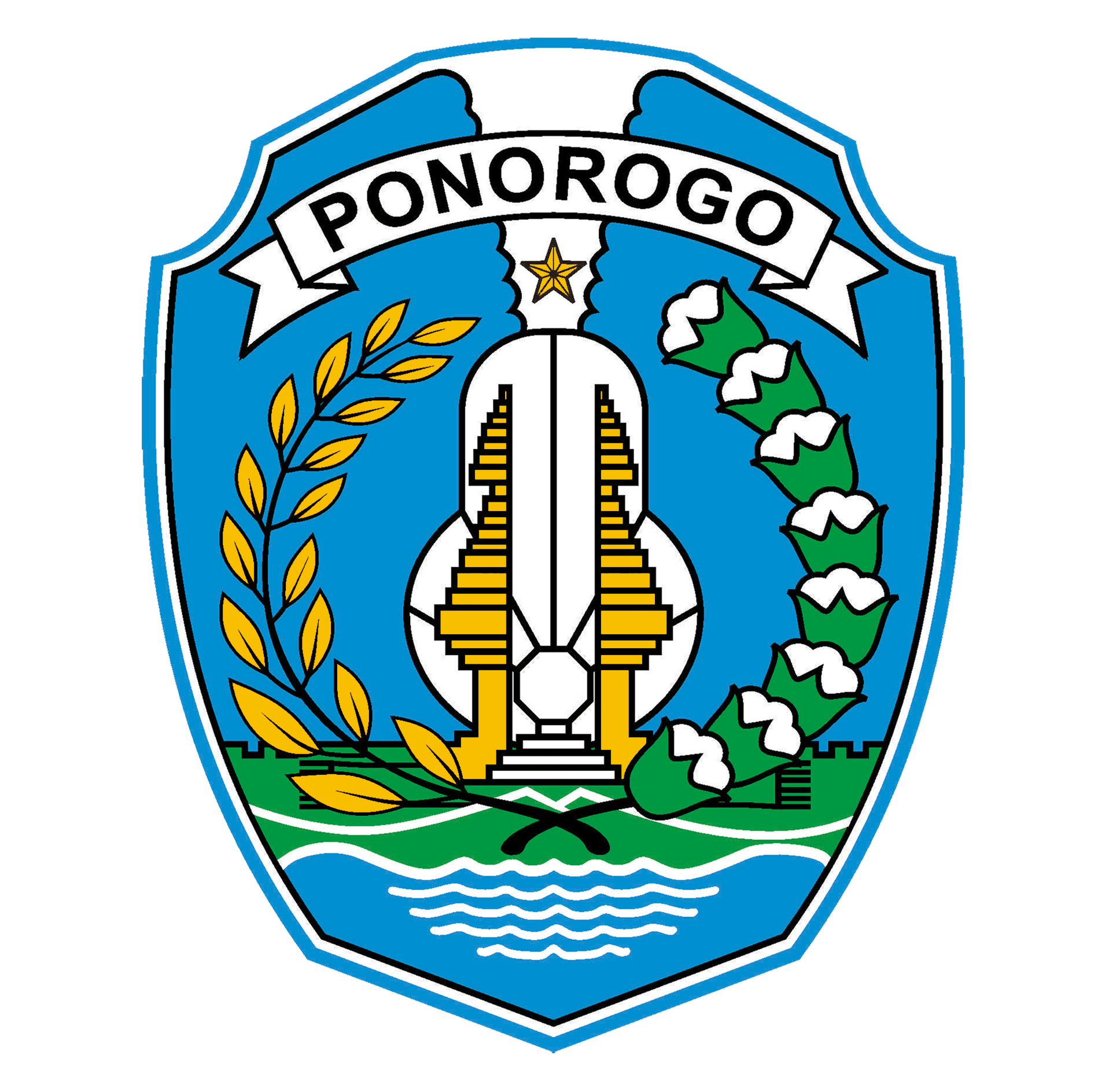
- Coat of arms
- Motto: Resik Endah Omber Girang Gemirang
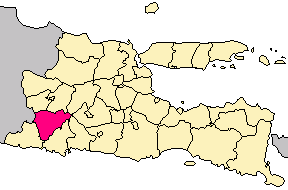
- Location of Ponorogo Regency in East Java

- Location in Java Location in Indonesia
- Coordinates: 7°52′10″S 111°27′46″E
- Indonesia: Indonesia
- Province: East Java
- Anniversary: 11 August 1496
- Capital: Ponorogo

Government
  - Regent: Lisdyarita (act)
  - Vice Regent: Vacant

Area
  - Total: 1,418.62 km^{2} (547.73 sq mi)
- Elevation: 100 m (330 ft)

Population (mid 2025 estimate)
  - Total: 980,209
  - Density: 690.960/km^{2} (1,789.58/sq mi)
- Demonyms: Warga Ponorogo (id); Wong Ponorogo (Ponoragan) (jv); Ponoragan (en)
- Time zone: UTC+7 (Western Indonesia Time)
- Area code: +62 352
- Website: ponorogo.go.id

Ponorogo Regency (Indonesian: Kabupaten Ponorogo; Javanese: ꦑꦧꦸꦥꦠꦺꦤ꧀ꦦꦤꦫꦒ, romanized: Kabupatèn Pånårågå) is an inland regency (kabupaten) of East Java Province of Indonesia. It is considered the birthplace of Reog Ponorogo, a traditional Indonesian dance form. The regency covers an area of 1,418.62 km^{2} (547.73 sq mi), and it had a population of 855,281 at the 2010 census and 949,318 at the 2020 census; the official estimate as of mid 2025 was 980,209 (comprising 486,306 males and 493,903 females).

== Geography ==
Ponorogo Regency is located in the southwestern part of the province of East Java on the border with Central Java province. It lies approximately 200 km (120 mi) south-west of Surabaya, the provincial capital of East Java. The regency lies between 92 and 2,563 metres (302 and 8,409 ft) above sea level and covers an area of about 1,418.62 km^{2} (547.73 sq mi).

== History ==
According to Babad Ponorogo history, Ponorogo was founded when Bathoro Katong conquered the Wengker region. This region had previously been controlled by Suryo Ngalam Wengker. Initially, Bathoro Katong settled in modern-day Pekalongan, specifically in the village of Setono within the Jenangan District. Despite facing numerous challenges, Raden Katong, Aji Selo, and Ki Ageng Mirah and his family persevered in establishing settlements in the region.

With the consent of all parties, Bathoro Katong established the Duchy of Ponorogo on 11 August 1496. This date is commemorated as the founding of Ponorogo, supported by ancient artifacts, including a pair of stone gilangs situated in front of the fifth gate of the Batoro Katong tomb complex. The gilang depicts a human meditating, trees, an eagle, and elephants (candrasengkala gilang memet). These elements collectively symbolize the Saka year 1496.

== Economy ==
Ponorogo Regency is one of the fastest-growing regencies in East Java. To improve irrigation and economy, a new "Bendo Dam" was built and officially opened in September 2021.

== Administrative districts ==
The regency is divided into twenty-one districts (kecamatan), tabulated below with their areas and their populations at the 2010 census and 2020 census, together with the official estimates as of mid 2025. The districts all have the same names as their administrative centres. The table also includes the number of administrative villages in each district (totaling 281 rural desa and 26 urban kelurahan), and its postal codes.

Kode Wilayah	Name of District (kecamatan)	Area in km^{2}	Pop'n census 2010	Pop'n census 2020	Pop'n estimate mid 2025	No. of villages	Post codes
35.02.02	Ngrayun	172.92	55,416	59,788	62,541	11	63464
35.02.01	Slahung	96.62	49,267	53,356	55,001	22	63463
35.02.03	Bungkal	58.91	34,240	38,161	39,696	19	63462
35.02.04	Sambit	60.48	35,566	39,629	41,199	16	63474
35.02.05	Sawoo	128.49	54,696	60,856	63,376	14	63475
35.02.06	Sooko	53.36	21,767	23,920	24,691	6	63482
35.02.21	Pudak	64.92	8,893	9,164	9,689	6	63418
35.02.07	Pulung	133.24	45,993	51,579	53,533	18	63481
35.02.08	Mlarak	32.09	36,138	35,044	36,296	15	63472
35.02.10	Siman	44.31	41,655	48,053	48,664	18 ^{(a)}	63471
35.02.09	Jetis	23.45	29,049	31,216	32,268	14	63473
35.02.11	Balong	59.73	41,565	47,052	48,806	20	63461
35.02.12	Kauman	33.55	40,015	46,419	47,730	16	63451
35.02.20	Jambon	59.64	38,929	45,773	48,455	13	63456
35.02.13	Badegan	58.05	29,082	33,015	34,592	10	63455
35.02.14	Sampung	82.51	35,845	39,843	40,871	12	63454
35.02.15	Sukorejo	58.39	49,564	57,586	59,761	18	63453
35.02.17	Ponorogo (town)	23.02	74,379	76,692	77,195	19 ^{(b)}	63411: 63419
35.02.16	Babadan	44.38	62,615	70,412	71,239	15 ^{(c)}	63491
35.02.18	Jenangan	68.08	51,508	60,688	62,774	17 ^{(d)}	63492
35.02.19	Ngebel	62.48	19,099	21,072	21,832	8	63493
	Totals	1,418.62	855,281	949,318	980,209	307	

Notes: (a) including 2 kelurahan (Mangunsuman and Ronowijayan).
(b) all 19 are urban kelurahan (Bangunsari, Banyudono, Beduri, Brotonegaran, Cokromenggalan, Jingglong, Kauman, Keniten, Kepatihan, Mangkujayan, Nologaten, Paju, Pakunden, Pinggirsari, Purbosuman, Surodikraman, Tamanarum, Tambakbayan and Tonatan).
(c) including 3 kelurahan (Kadipaten, Kertosari and Patihan Wetan).
(d) including 2 kelurahan (Setono and Singosaren).

== Ponorogo town ==
Ponorogo District (Kecamatan Ponorogo) is composed of 18 urban villages (kelurahan), listed below with their areas and their populations as at mid 2023.

Kode Wilayah	Name of kelurahan	Area in km^{2}	Pop'n estimate mid 2023	Post codes
35.02.17.1001	Paju	1.85	3,981	63415
35.02.17.1002	Brotonegaran	1.59	5,059	63419
35.02.17.1003	Pakunden	0.73	3,053	63416
35.02.17.1004	Kepatihan	1.18	4,624	63416
35.02.17.1005	Surodikraman	1.09	5,592	63419
35.02.17.1006	Purbosuman	2.20	6,341	63417
35.02.17.1007	Tonatan	1.18	6,243	63418
35.02.17.1008	Bangunsari	0.75	4,769	63419
35.02.17.1009	Taramarum	0.09	1,287	63419
35.02.17.1010	Kauman	0.58	2,749	63414

Kode Wilayah	Name of kelurahan	Area in km^{2}	Pop'n estimate mid 2023	Post codes
35.02.17.1011	Tambakbayan	0.74	3,166	63419
35.02.17.1012	Pinggirsari	0.69	1,834	63419
35.02.17.1013	Mangkujayan	2.24	8,870	63413
35.02.17.1014	Banyudono	0.90	4,936	63411
35.02.17.1015	Nologaten	0.71	5,026	63411
35.02.17.1016	Cokromenggalan	1.07	4,115	63411
35.02.17.1017	Keniten	2.77	9,833	63412
35.02.17.1018	Jingglong	0.64	1,756	63411
35.02.17.1019	Beduri	1.29	2,888	63412
35.02.17	Totals	25.83	86,122	

== Culture ==
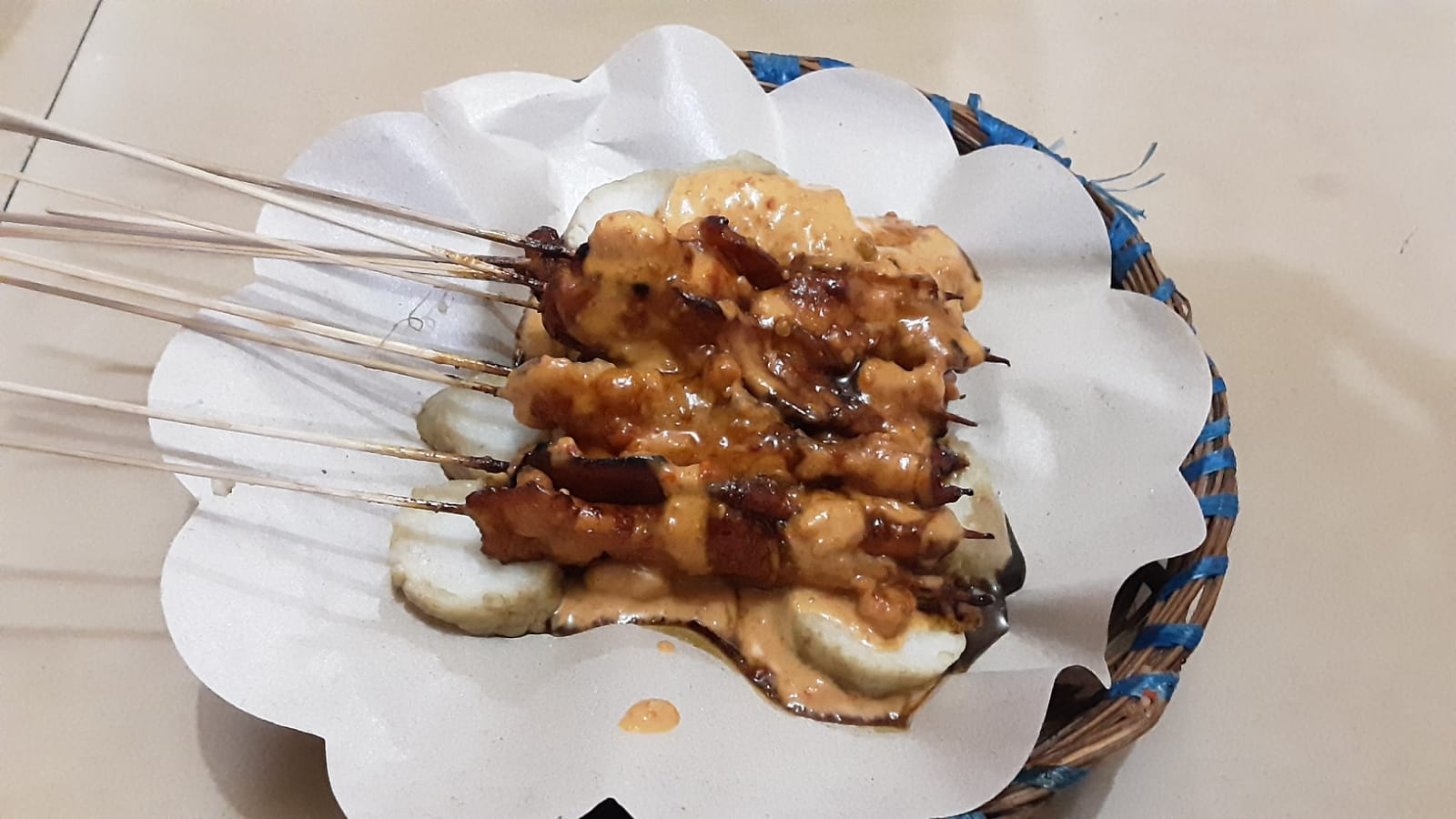
Sate Ponorogo

Ponorogo town, generally considered the birthplace of Reog, is also known by the names City (of) Reog and City (of) Rasta. Each year in the Islamic month of Muharram, Ponorogo holds a celebration known as Grebeg Suro, "the party of the people". Grebeg Suro involves many traditional events such as the National Reog Festival, the Heritage Carnival, and the Larungan Proceedings of Prayer held at Lake Ngebel.

On 11 August, the anniversary of the founding of the Ponorogo Regency is celebrated. The day marks 11 August 1496, when Bathara Katong, the first leader of Ponorogo, went from the Old Town to the new Town of Ponorogo and crowned himself the first Duke of Ponorogo.

Ponorogo is also known for its culinary specialties such as Sate Ponorogo (grilled marinated chicken, served in peanut sauce, garnished with shredded shallots, chilli paste, and lime juice).

== Education ==
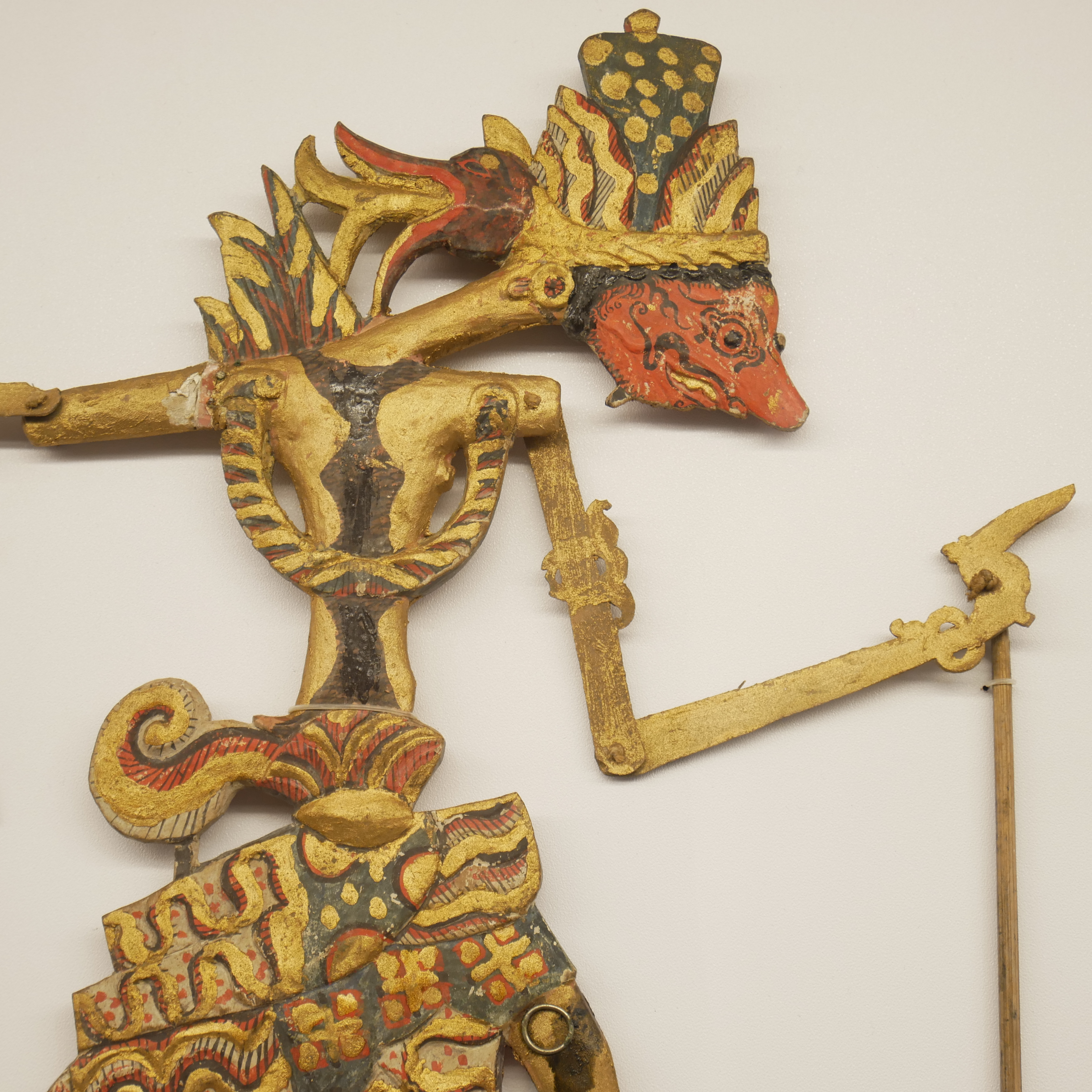
Wayang Kulit puppet of Adhipati Klonosewandono―a royal member from Ponorogo.

Educational institutions in Ponorogo range from pre-school and kindergarten to university.

Pre-school and kindergarten facilities are mainly provided by private or religious institutions and are available in almost every village. Elementary schools are run by public and private institutions. There is at least one public elementary school in every village and some villages have more than one public elementary school.

There are a number of both junior and senior high schools in Ponorogo. High schools exist in every district. In addition to senior high schools, students can study at vocational high schools. Ponorogo also has several universities which are mostly run by private or religious institutions. There are three public universities, Akademi Komunitas Negeri Ponorogo, Akademi Keperawatan Pemkab Ponorogo, and IAIN Ponorogo. There are also many Islamic boarding schools, including the Pondok Modern Darussalam Gontor located in the village of Gontor in the Mlarak District.

== Sport and recreation ==
Telaga (lake) Ngebel covers approximately 150 hectares and is popular for jet skiing and other water sports. The lake is roughly a one-hour drive (about 30 kilometers) from Ponorogo or Madiun.

== Recognition ==
In the Autonomy Awards 2011, Ponorogo Regency received the Grand Award of Public Service Innovation.

== Climate ==
Ponorogo has 65–95% of humidity. The maximum humidity is 95% and the average humidity is 80%. The wind velocity of Ponorogo is within the range of 0 to 7 km/h (0.0 to 4.3 mph) with an average of 4 km/h (2.5 mph). The temperature of this city is within the range of 21.0 to 33.3 °C (69.8 to 91.9 °F) with an average of 27.2 °C (81.0 °F).

Month	1	2	3	4	5	6	7	8	9	10	11	12
Average Temperature (Celsius)	27.4	26.4	27.4	27.1	26.2	26.7	26.6	27.4	27.7	28.4	27.5	27.0
Min Temperature (Celsius)	22.7	21.7	22.6	22.6	21.0	22.1	22.0	23.3	22.7	23.4	22.2	22.4
Max Temperature (Celsius)	32.1	31.1	32.2	31.6	31.3	31.3	31.2	31.5	32.7	33.3	32.7	31.5
