= Bumiayu =

Bumiayu may refer to:

- Bumiayu, Brebes, an administrative district (kecamatan) in the Brebes Regency, Central Java, Indonesia.
- Bumiayu temple, an 8th to 13th-century Hindu temple complex located in Bumiayu village, Tanah Abang district, South Sumatra, Indonesia.
