= Tenun =

Traditional Austronesian weaving technique

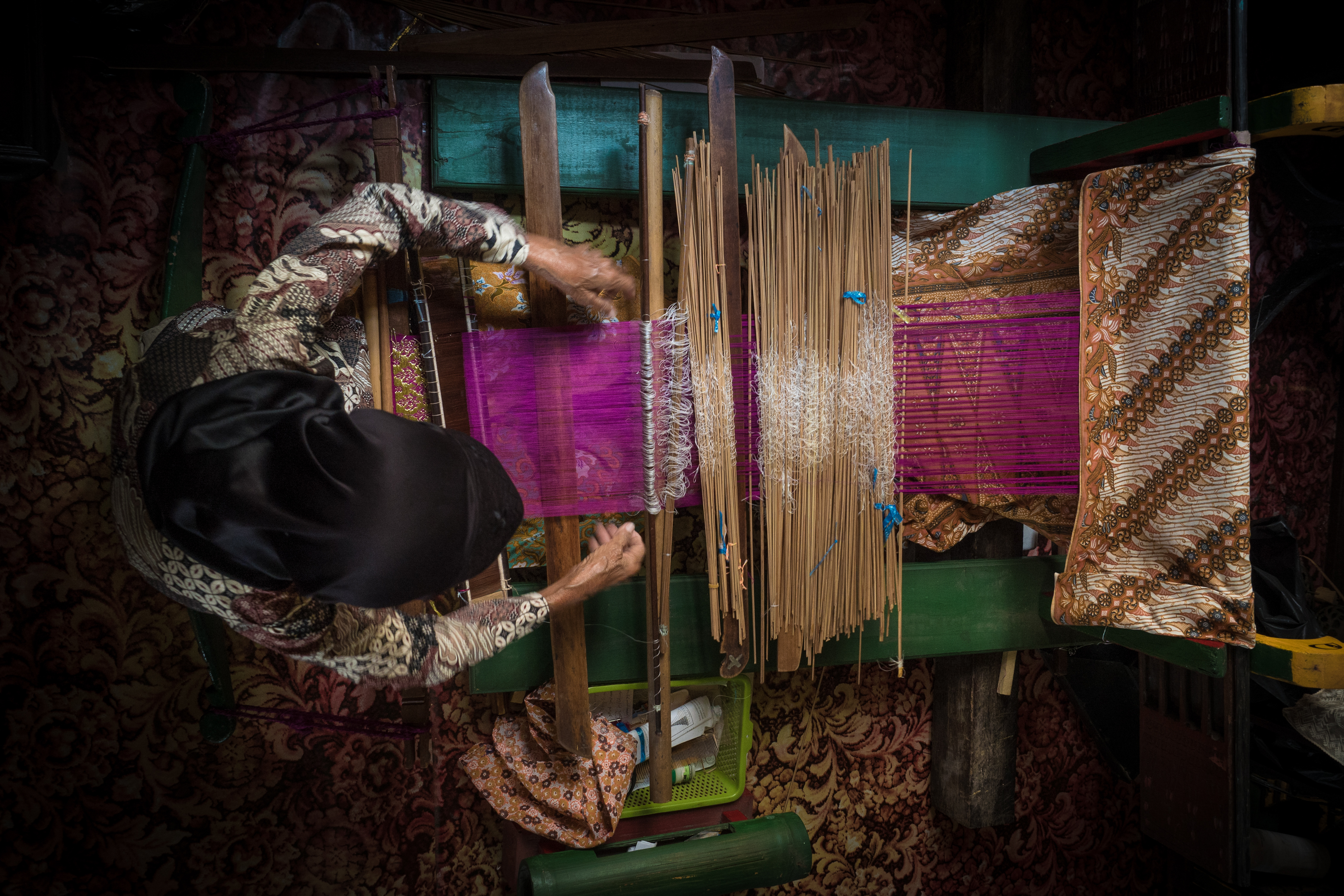
- A traditional weaver from Sumatra
- Type: Art Fabric
- Material: Silk, cotton, gold, silver
- Place of origin: Maritime Southeast Asia

Tenun is a traditional Austronesian peoples weaving technique found across Maritime Southeast Asia, deriving from a shared Proto-Austronesian root meaning 'to weave'. The word Tenun itself has a high meaning, historical value, and technique in terms of colors, motifs, and types of materials and threads used and each region has its own characteristics. In addition, Tenun is also one of Indonesia's original and oldest cultural heritages that is still maintained and preserved to this day.

Tenun fabrics are made in various places in the Indonesian archipelago such as on the islands of Sumatra, Java, Bali and Sulawesi, where each region has its own uniqueness and characteristics in terms of motifs and colors. These differences are caused by geographical location, beliefs, customs and the surrounding natural conditions including flora and fauna, each region has certain differences and uniqueness as well as contacts or relationships between regions, from the many types of Tenun, ikat and songket are the most famous, even tenun ikat is well known and popular in many countries.

Since 2010, various Tenun traditions practiced throughout Indonesia officially recognized and regarded by the Ministry of Education, Culture, Research, and Technology of Republic Indonesia as integral part of the National Intangible Cultural Heritage of Indonesia.

== Etymology ==
The technique of weaving cloth was brought to Insular Southeast Asia (ISEA) as a result of the Austronesian expansion. The word tenun goes back the reconstructed Proto-Austronesian form *tenun 'to weave (cloth)', which is widely attested in Taiwan and ISEA.

== History ==
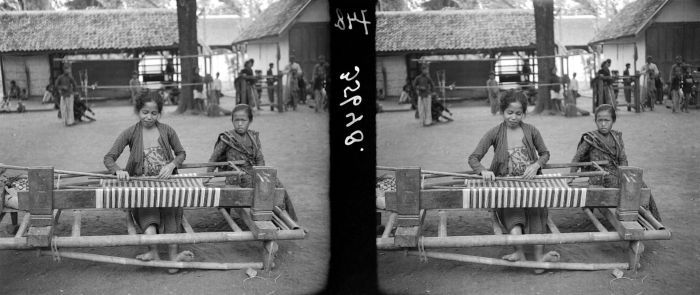
The Tenun weavers in Yogyakarta, circa 1900

Tenun fabrics are thought to have existed since the Neolithic period. This has been proven by the discovery of prehistoric objects, such as woven stamps, tools for spinning, and materials that are clearly woven on cloth made of cotton, which are more than 3,000 years old at the East Sumba site, Gunung wingko, Yogyakarta, Gilimanuk and Melolo.

In the Neolithic period, the materials for making clothes were still very simple, such as fibers, leaves, bark, animal skins, and plant roots. The manufacture of clothes from bark must choose a type of tree that is hard and has long wood fibers, then the tree is skinned, then the wood fiber is soaked in water to make it soft. Then use a bat in the form of a stone to shape the bark into cloth. The remnants of the tradition of making this kind of cloth are still found in the area of Central Sulawesi called Fuya and in Papua called Capo.

In Old Javanese inscriptions, terms can be found that describe the existence of weaving in the past. On the Karang Tengah inscription dated 847, there is the inscription "white hlai 1 (one) kalambi" which means one piece of white cloth and clothes. In the "Baru" inscription in 1034 AD the word Pawdikan means batik or weaver. In the "Tebu" inscription in 1021 AD and the inscription from Singhasari in 929 AD there is the term "makapas" or cotton. In folklore that has to do with weaving is the story of Sang Kuriang, an important character in the story, Dayang Sumbi, whose daily job is weaving. The manufacture of clothing in the past can be traced to the relief Perempuan menenun ("women are weaving") carved on a 14th-century stone pedestal from the Trowulan area, now stored in the Trowulan Museum, East Java.

In South Sumatra, songket weaving has existed since the seventh century. Based on the analysis conducted on the statues at the Bumiayu temple, it can be seen that songket has been worn by the people of South Sumatra since the seventh century AD, when Srivijaya was based in Palembang. This statue was found at the Bumiayu Temple Archaeological Site which is located on the downstream bank of Lematang River which empties into Musi River, precisely in Tanah Abang District, Penukal Abab Lematang Ilir district approximately 120 kilometres (75 mi) to the west of Palembang City.

== Technique ==
Tenun techniques can be divided into two major groups, namely techniques in making cloth and techniques for making decorations. In addition, there are two other things that are very important in making tenun, namely preparing the manufacture of yarn and making dyes. Traditionally, yarn is made using weights that are rotated with the fingers (Javanese: diplintir), the ballast is shaped like a top made of wood or terracotta. In western Indonesia (Sumatra, Java, Bali, Lombok) there is another way to make yarn using "Antih," this tool consists of a wide wheel that can be turned along with a dial (ontel) to turn the wheel. The manufacture of dyes in the past consisted of two colors blue and red. The blue color is obtained from indigo or Mirinda Citrifonela or noni. In addition there are dyes from other plants such as Achiote.

== Type of Tenun ==
Several types of traditional Indonesian woven fabrics

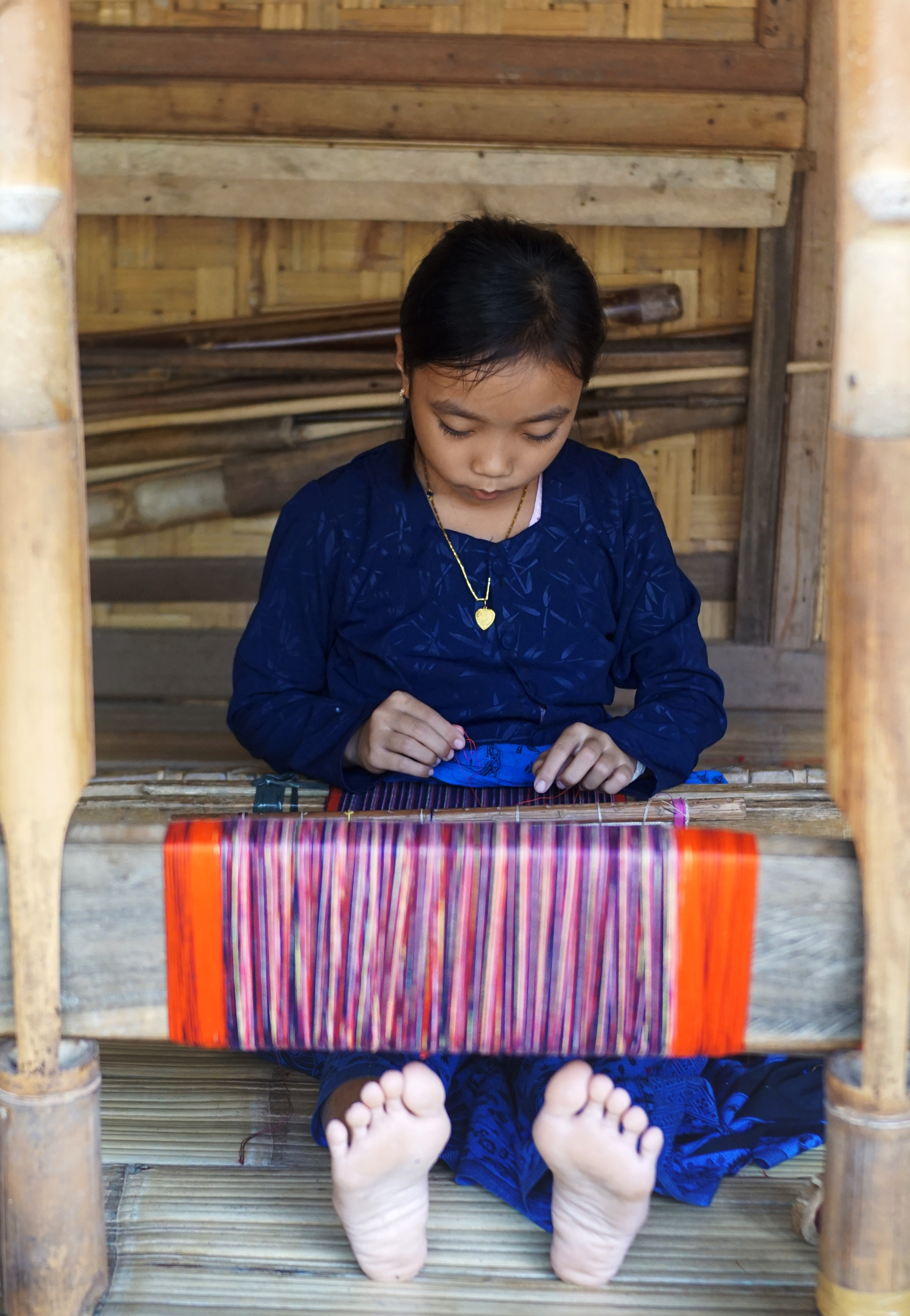
Tenun Baduy (Baduy)

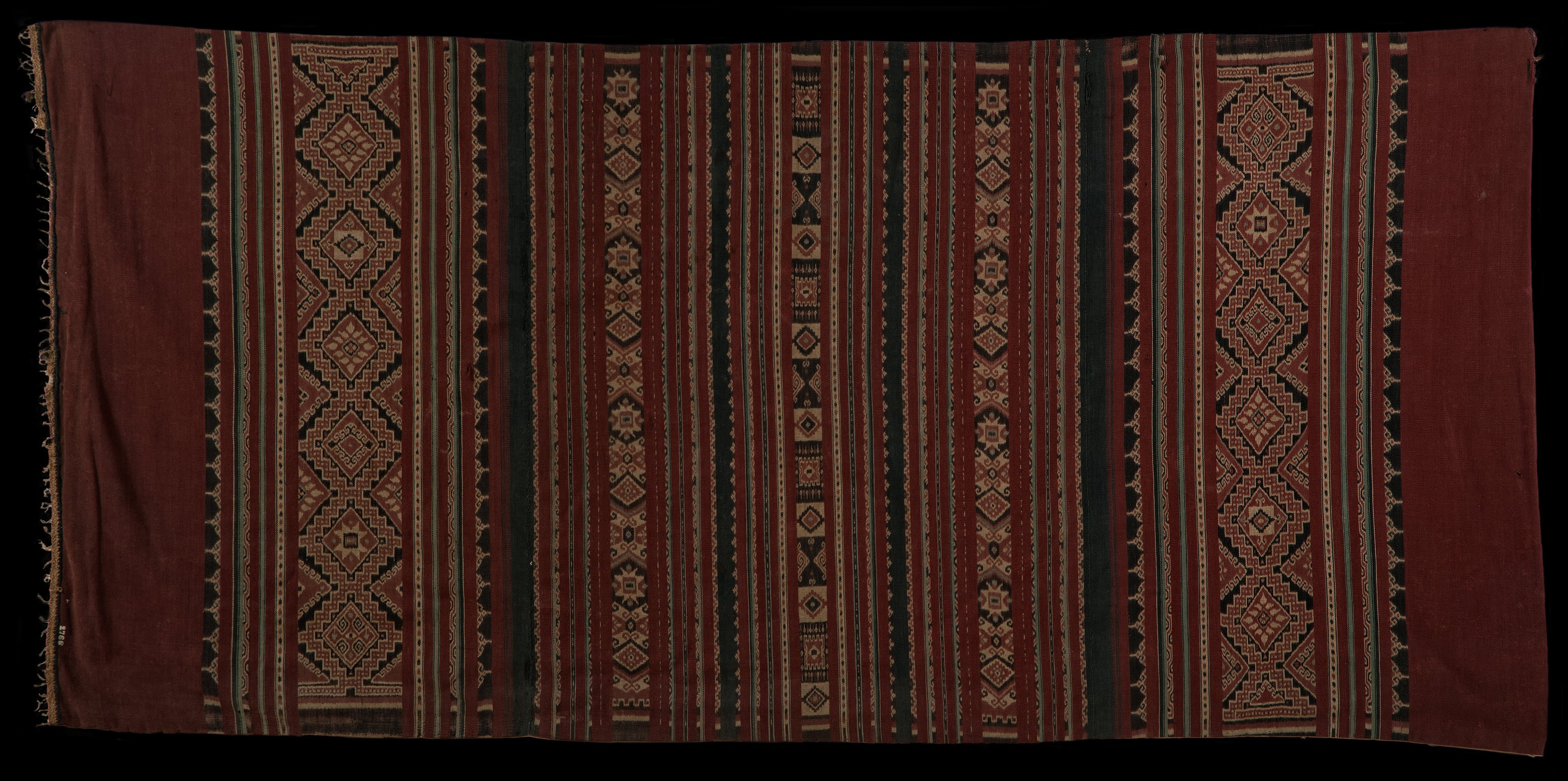
Bentenan (Minahasan)

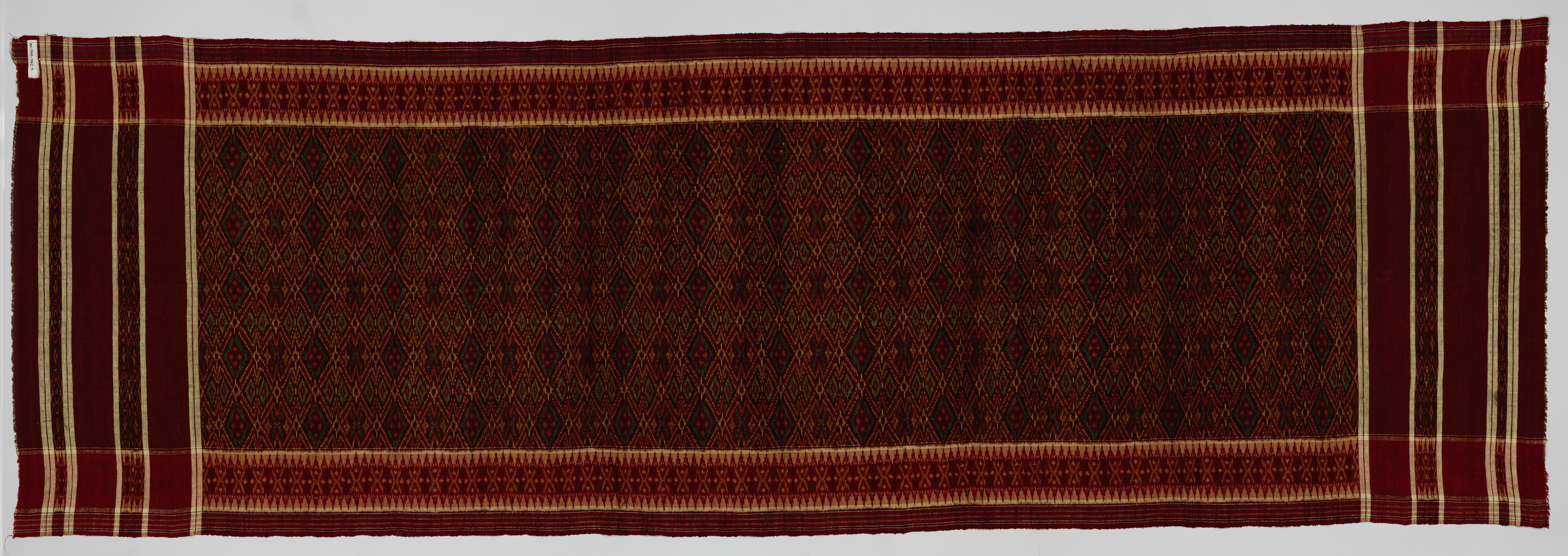
Cepuk (Balinese)

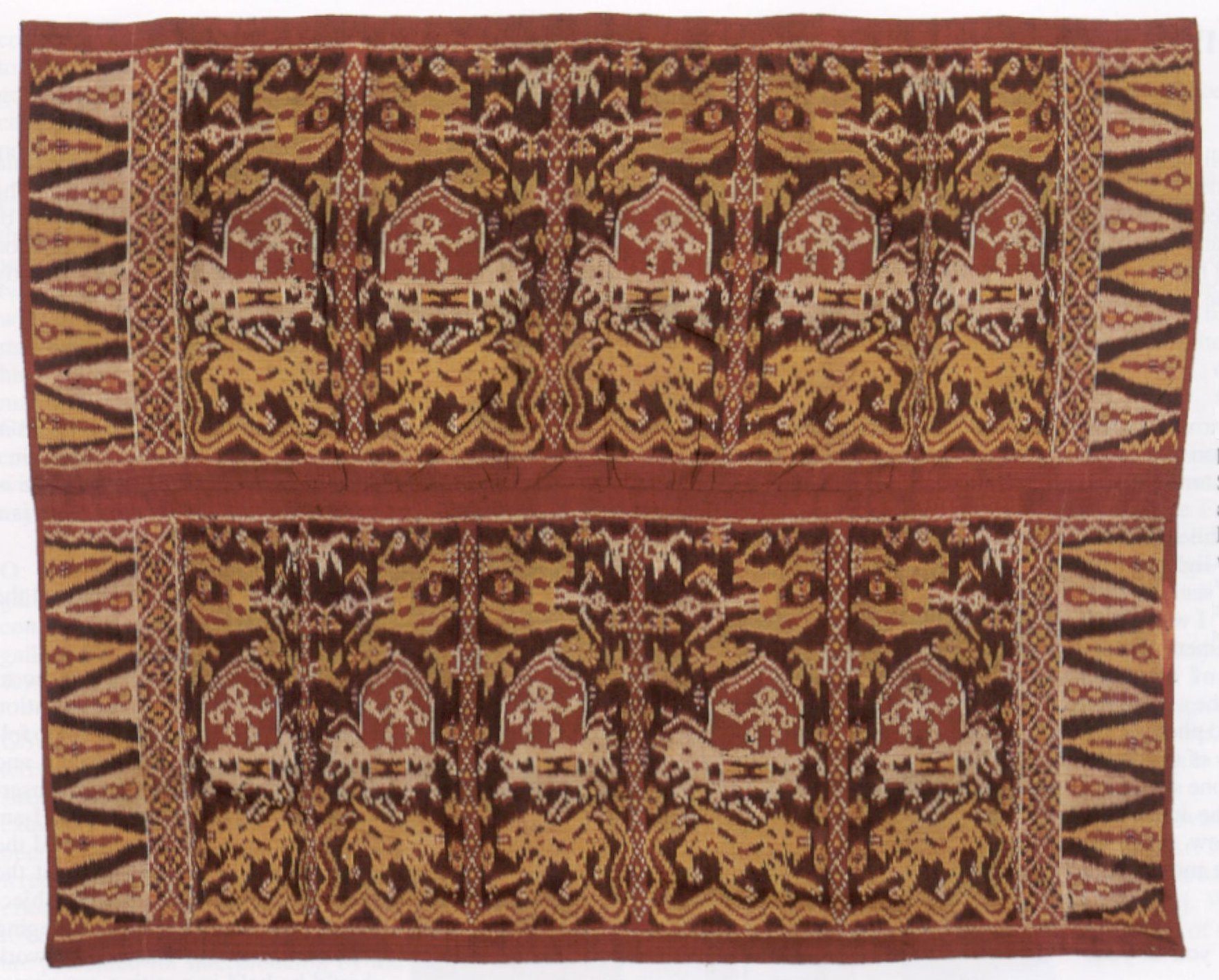
Endek (Balinese)

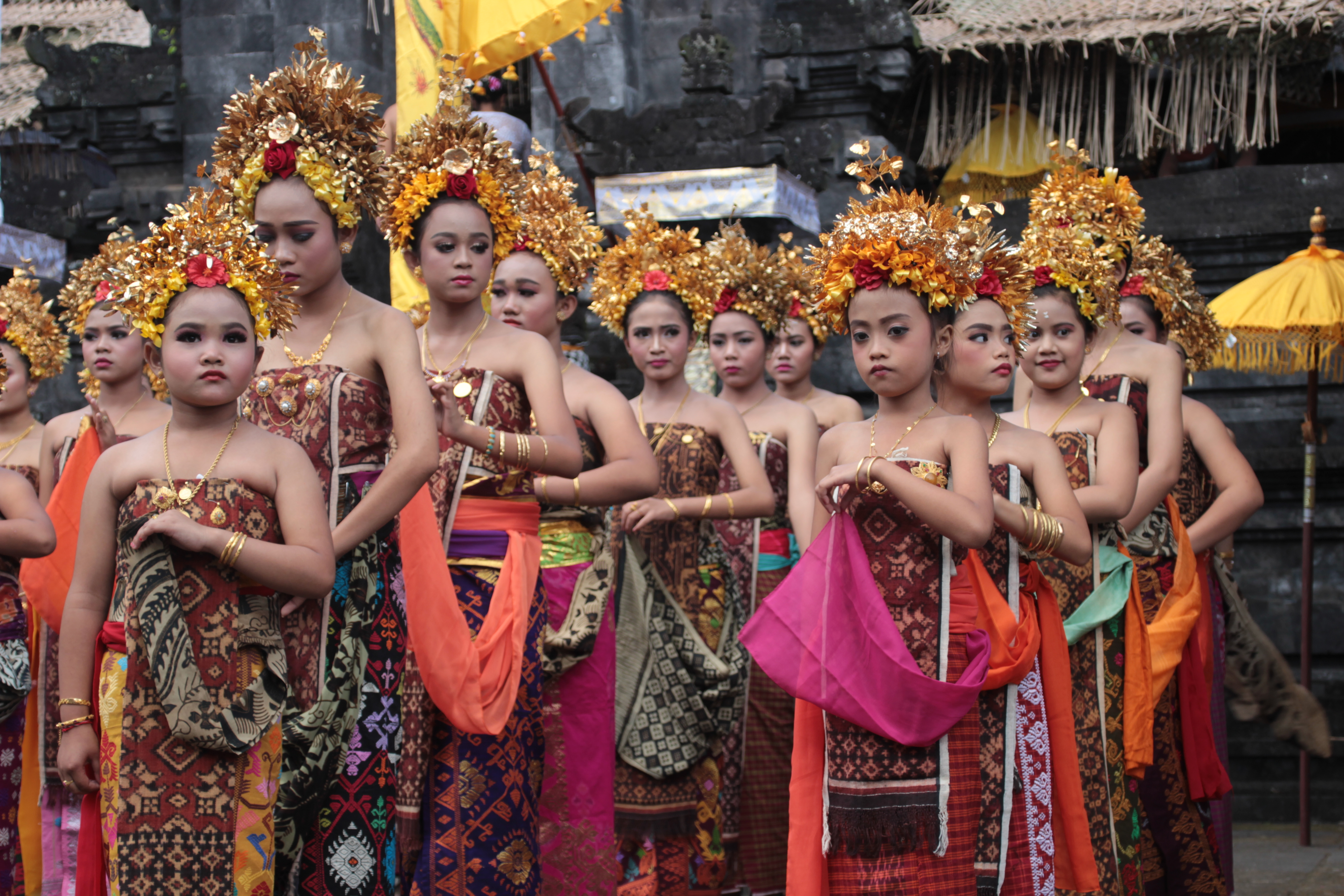
Geringsing (Balinese)

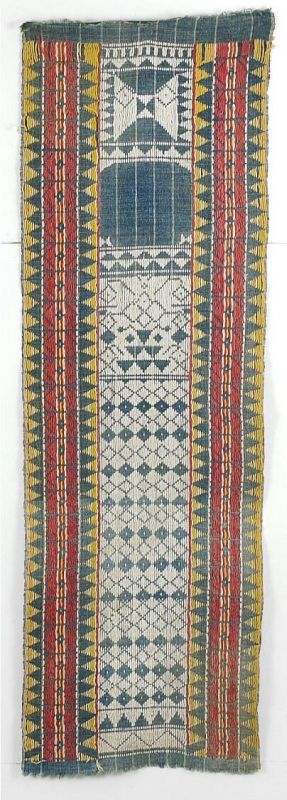
Lamak (Balinese)

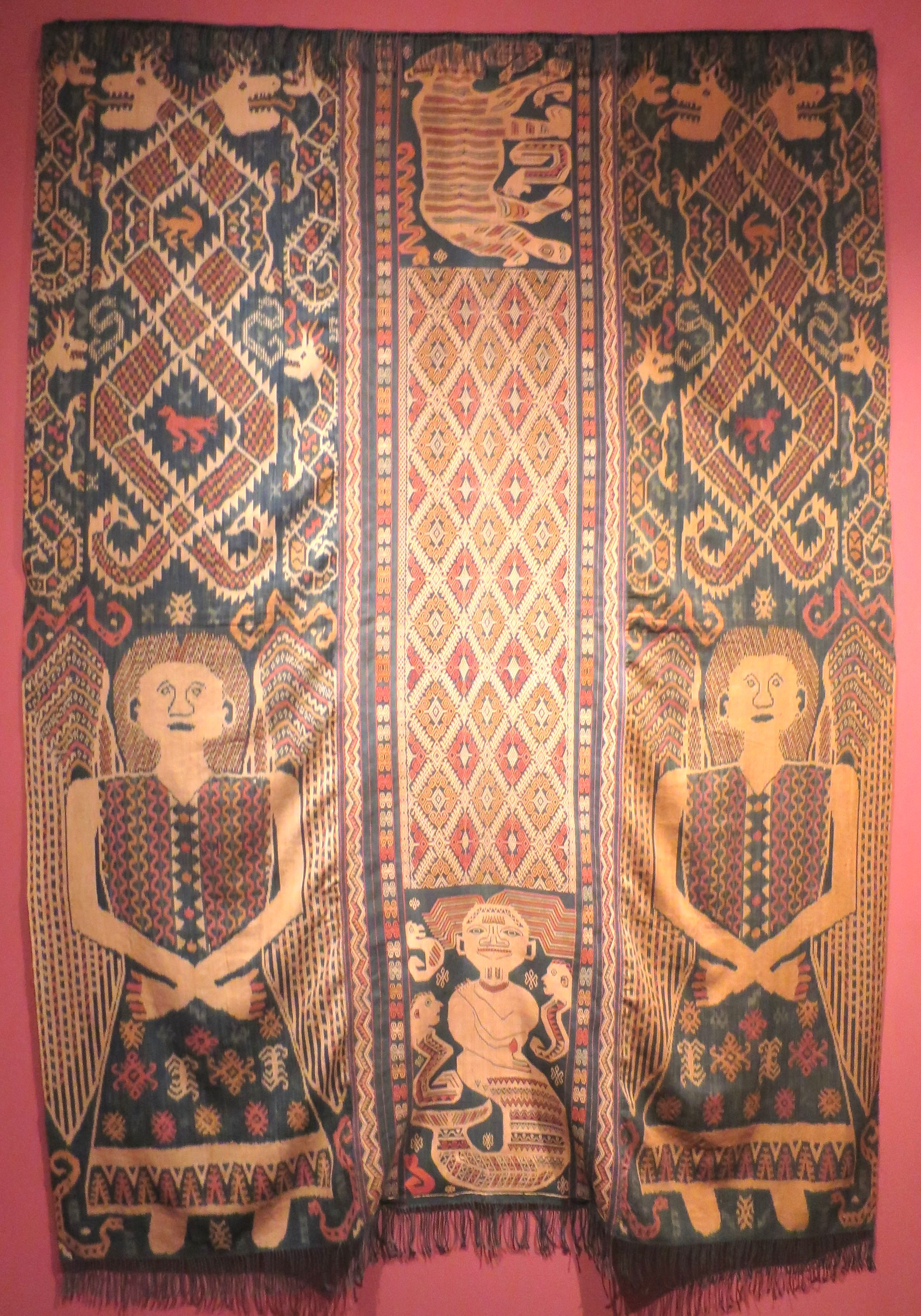
Hinggi (Sumba)

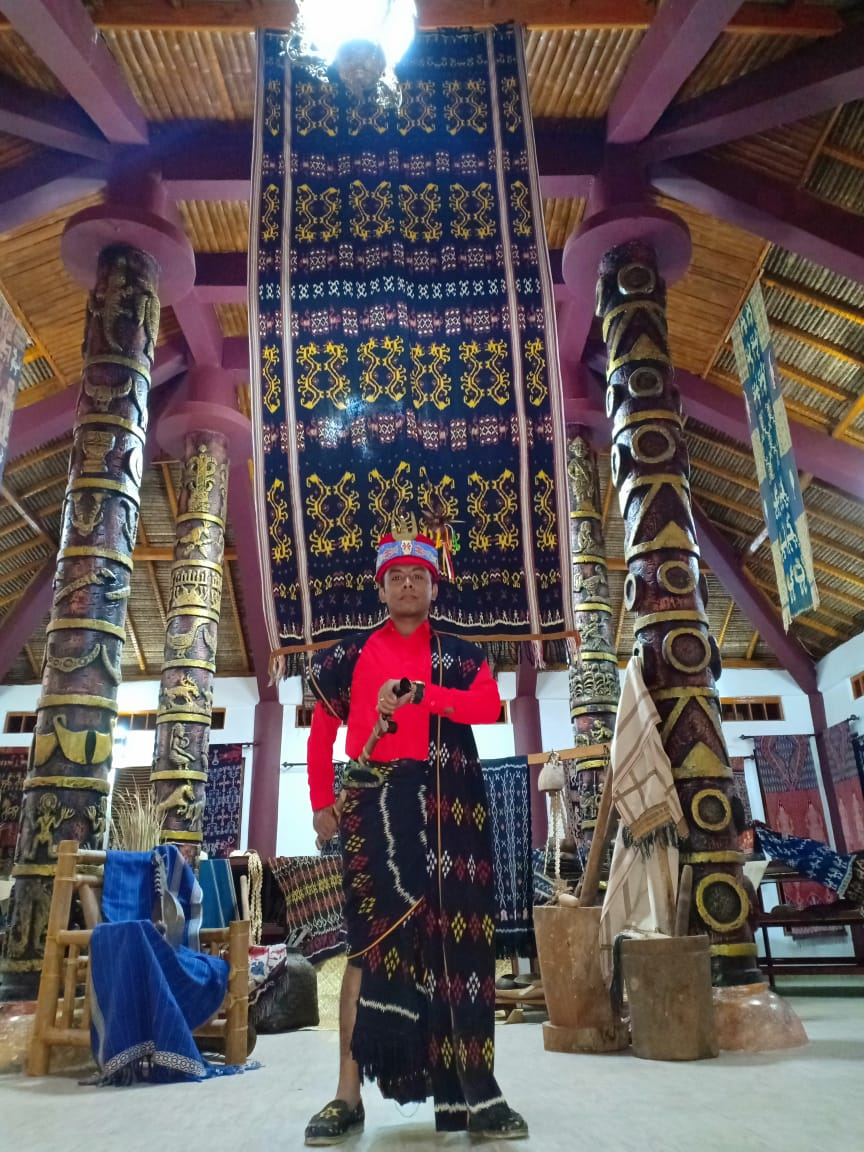
Ikat Kodi (Sumba)

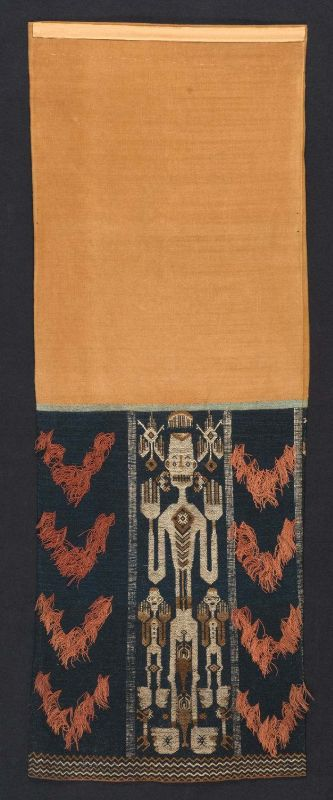
Lau (Sumba)

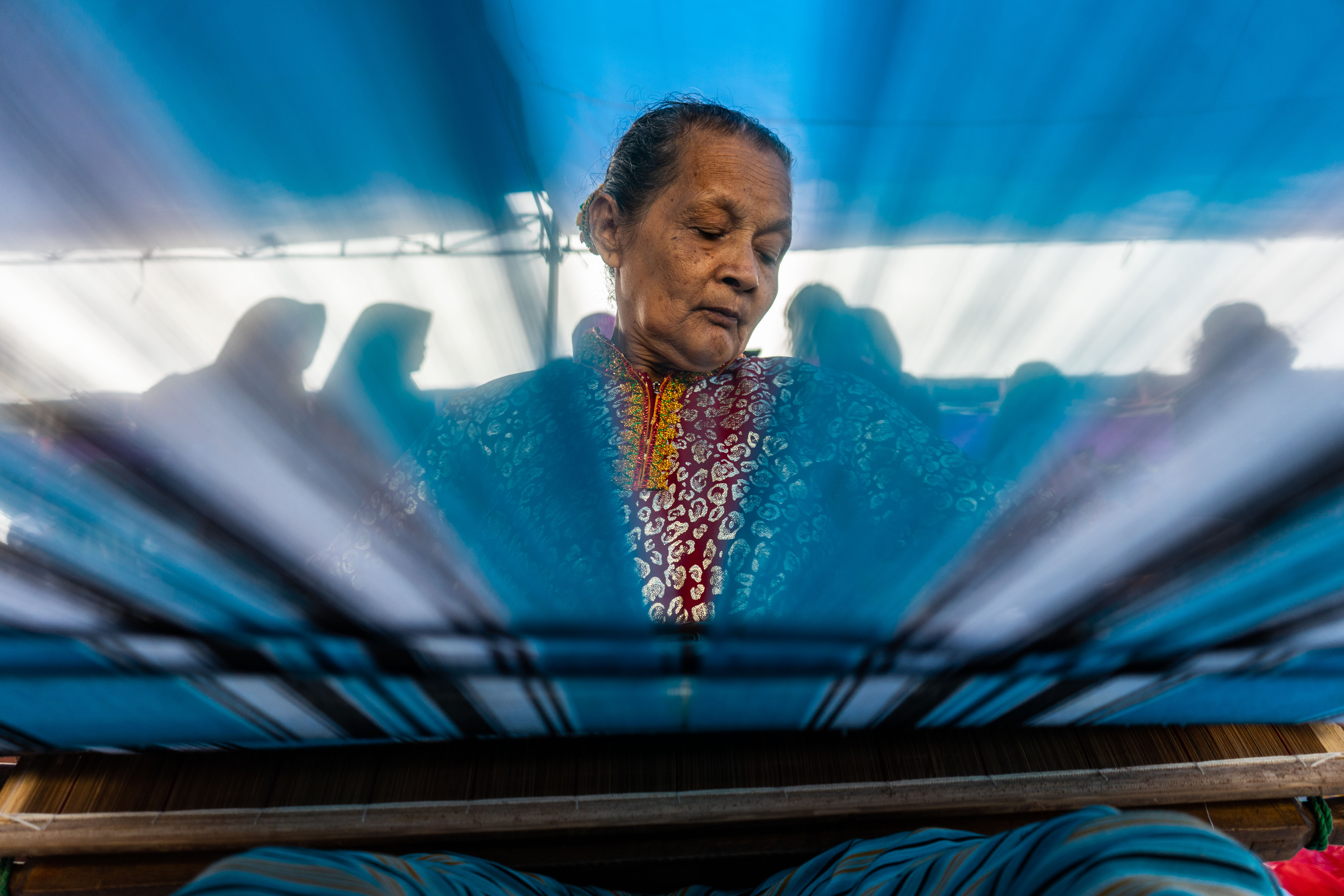
Kamohu (Butonese)

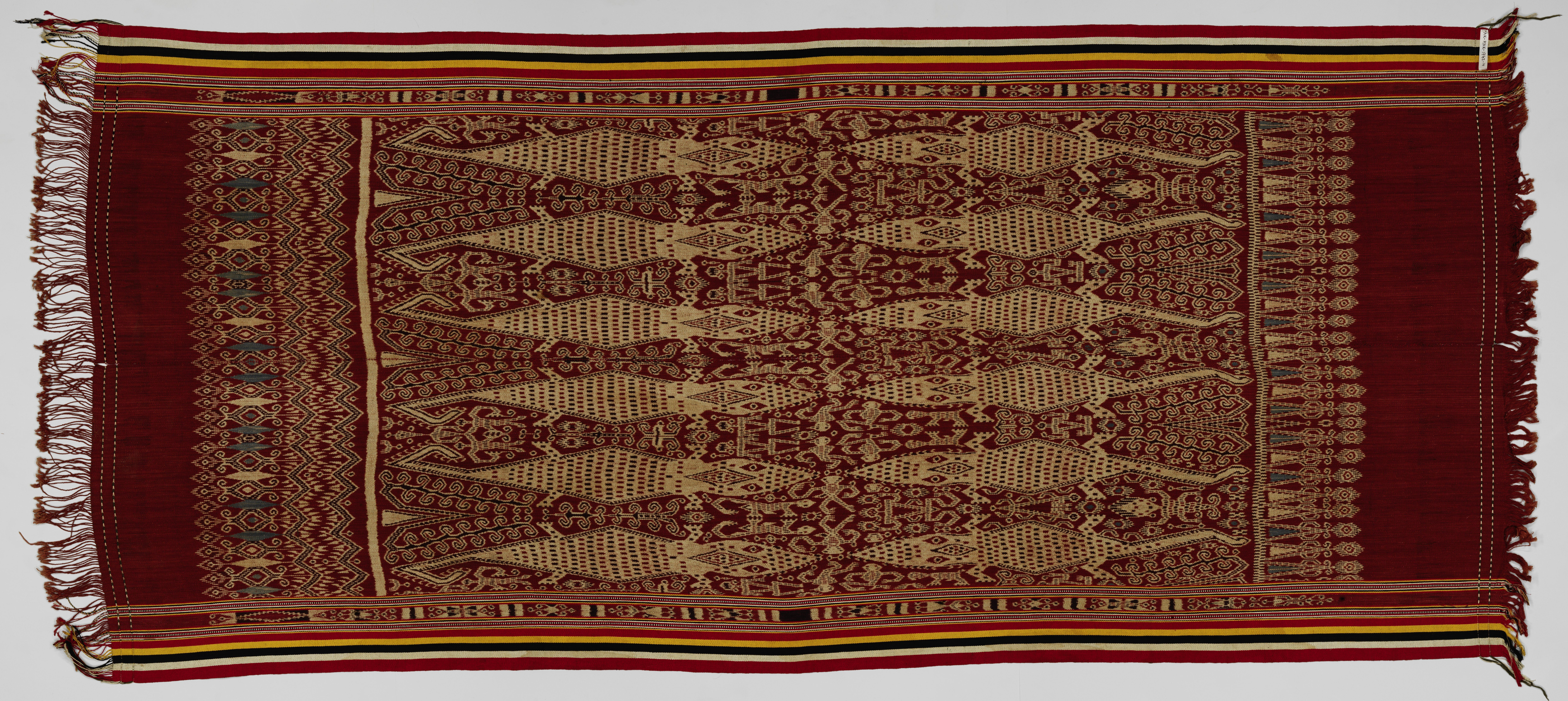
Pua Kumbu (Dayak)

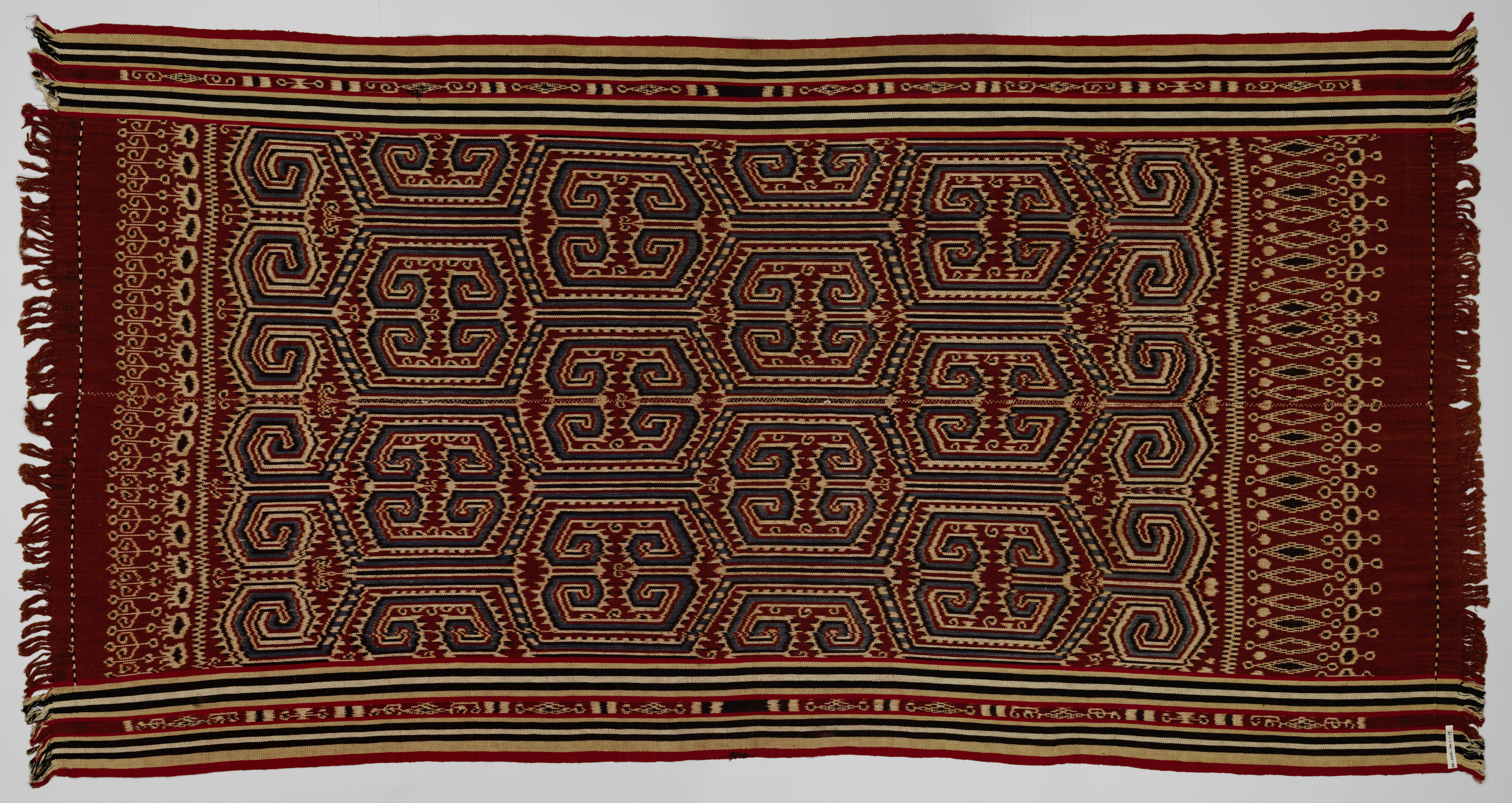
Pua (Dayak)

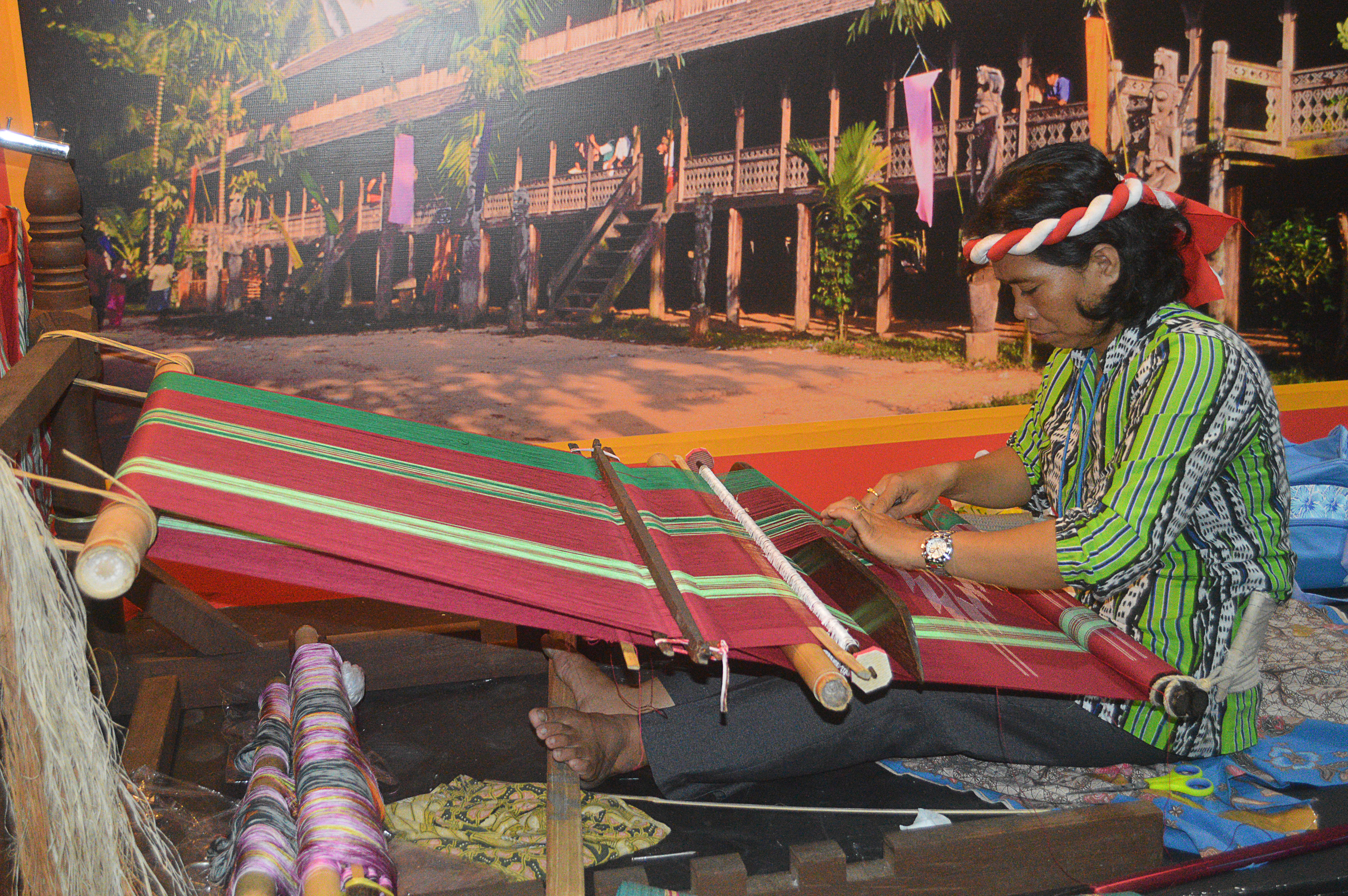
Ulap Doyo (Dayak)

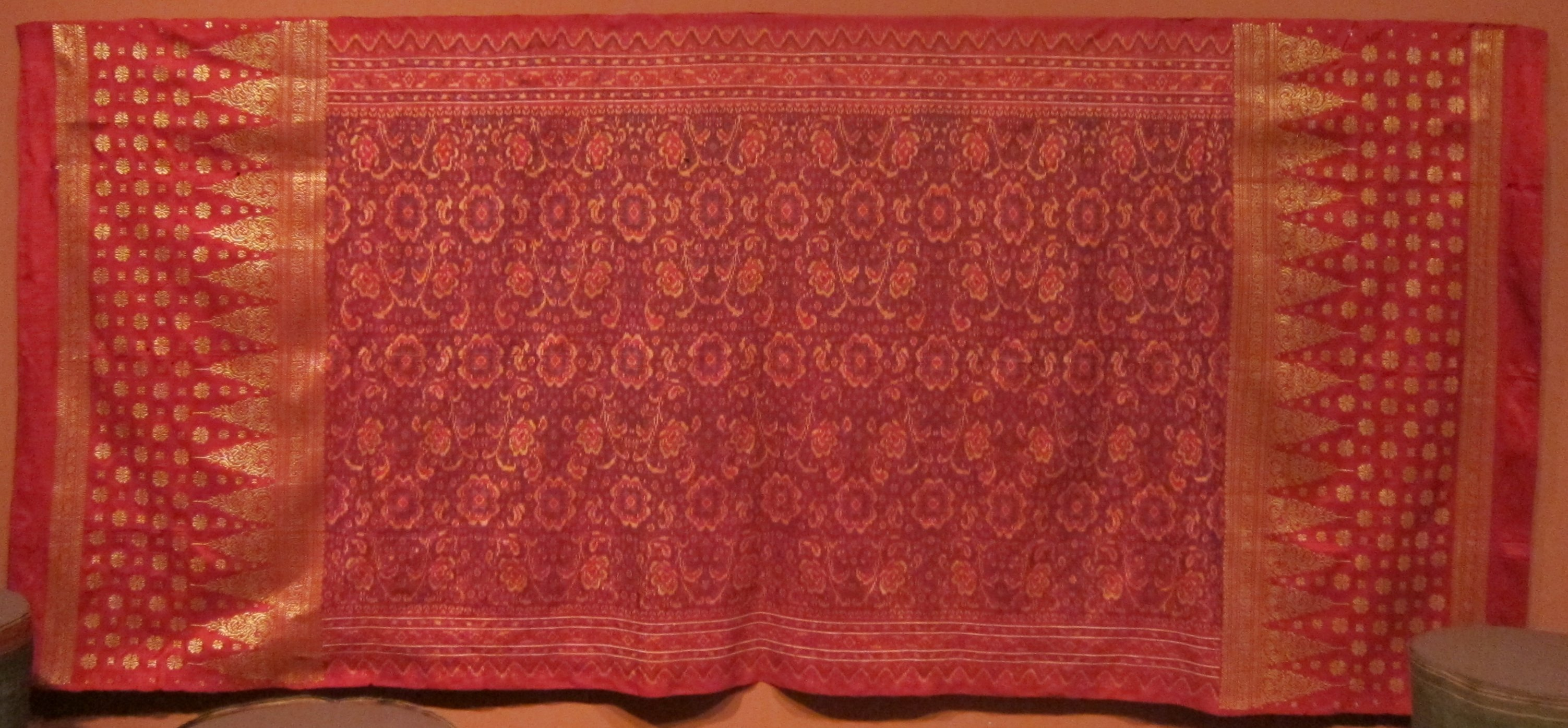
Limar (Bangka)

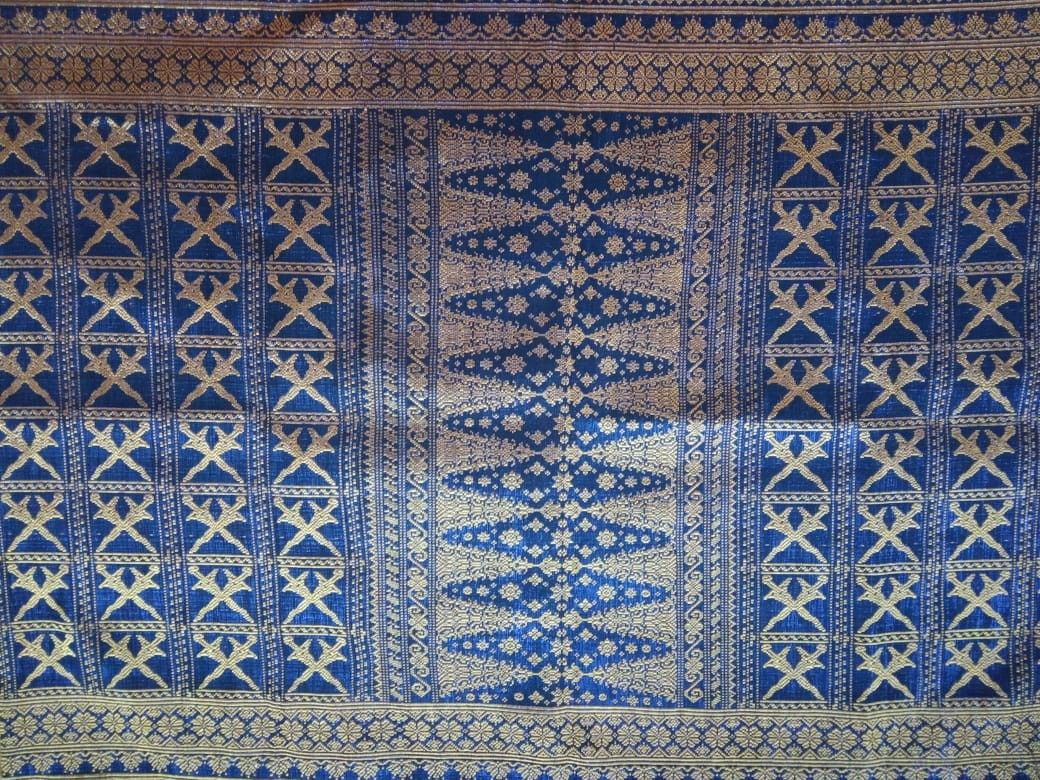
Lunggi (Sambas)

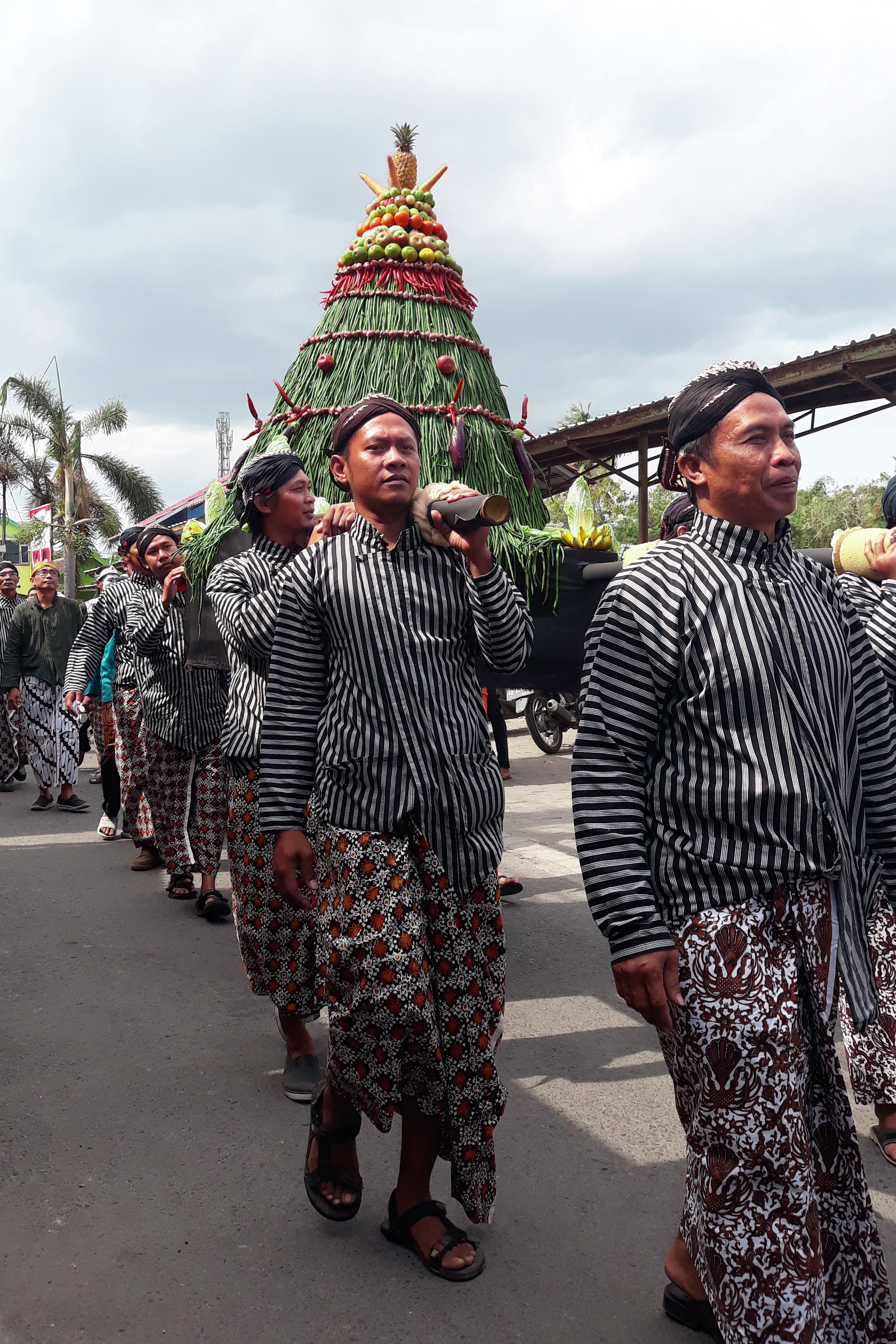
Lurik (Javanese)

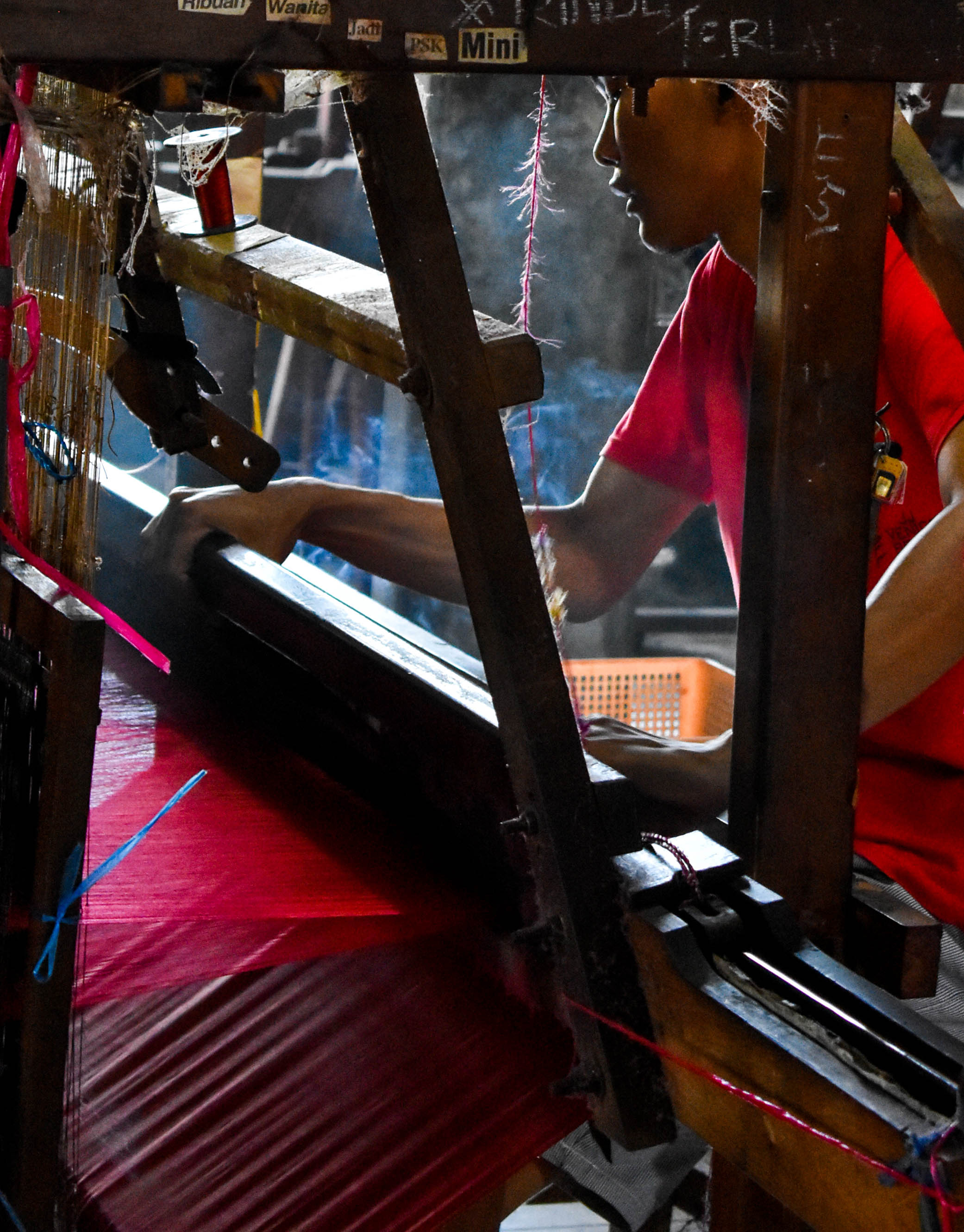
Tenun Troso (Javanese)

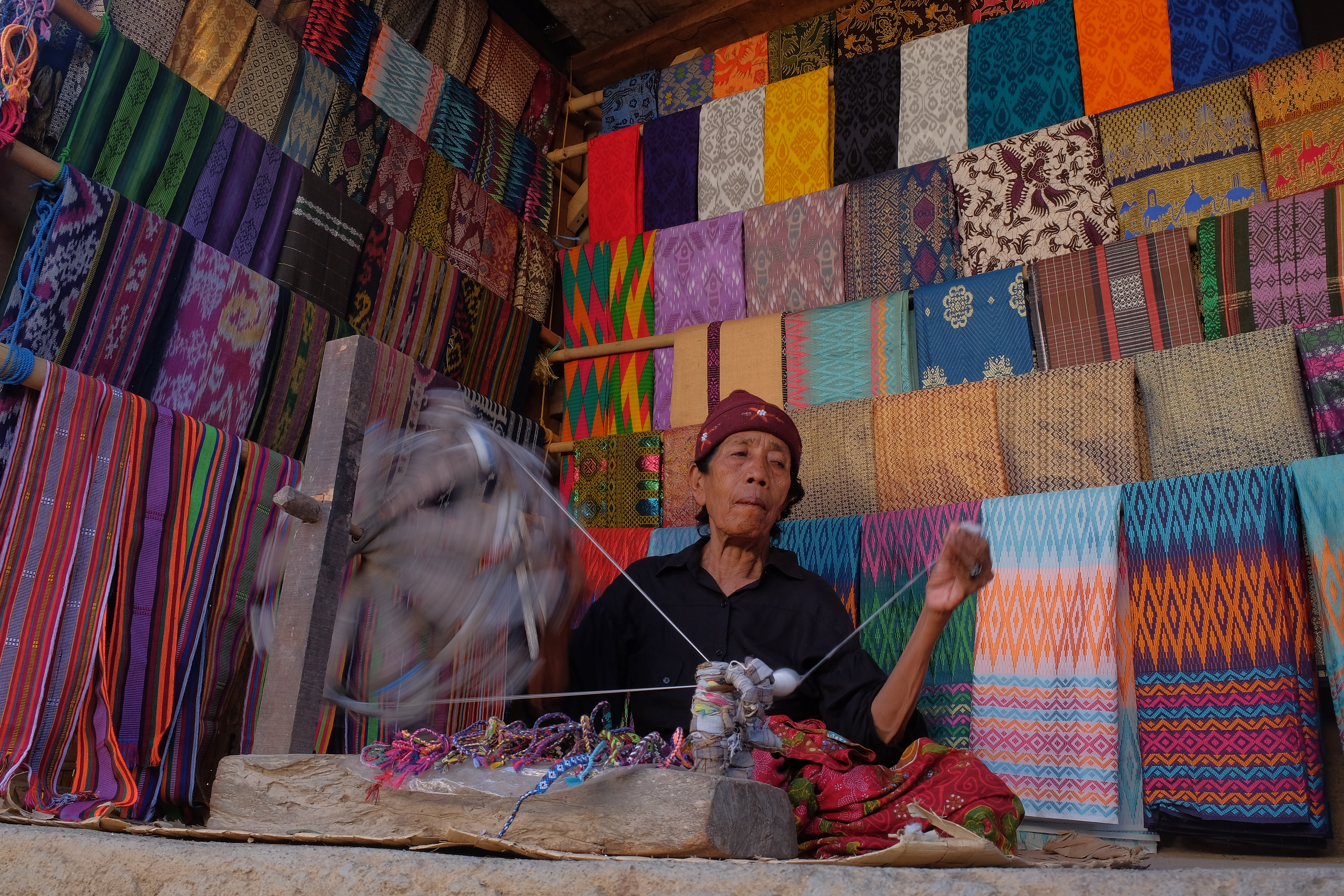
Tenun Sasak (Sasak)

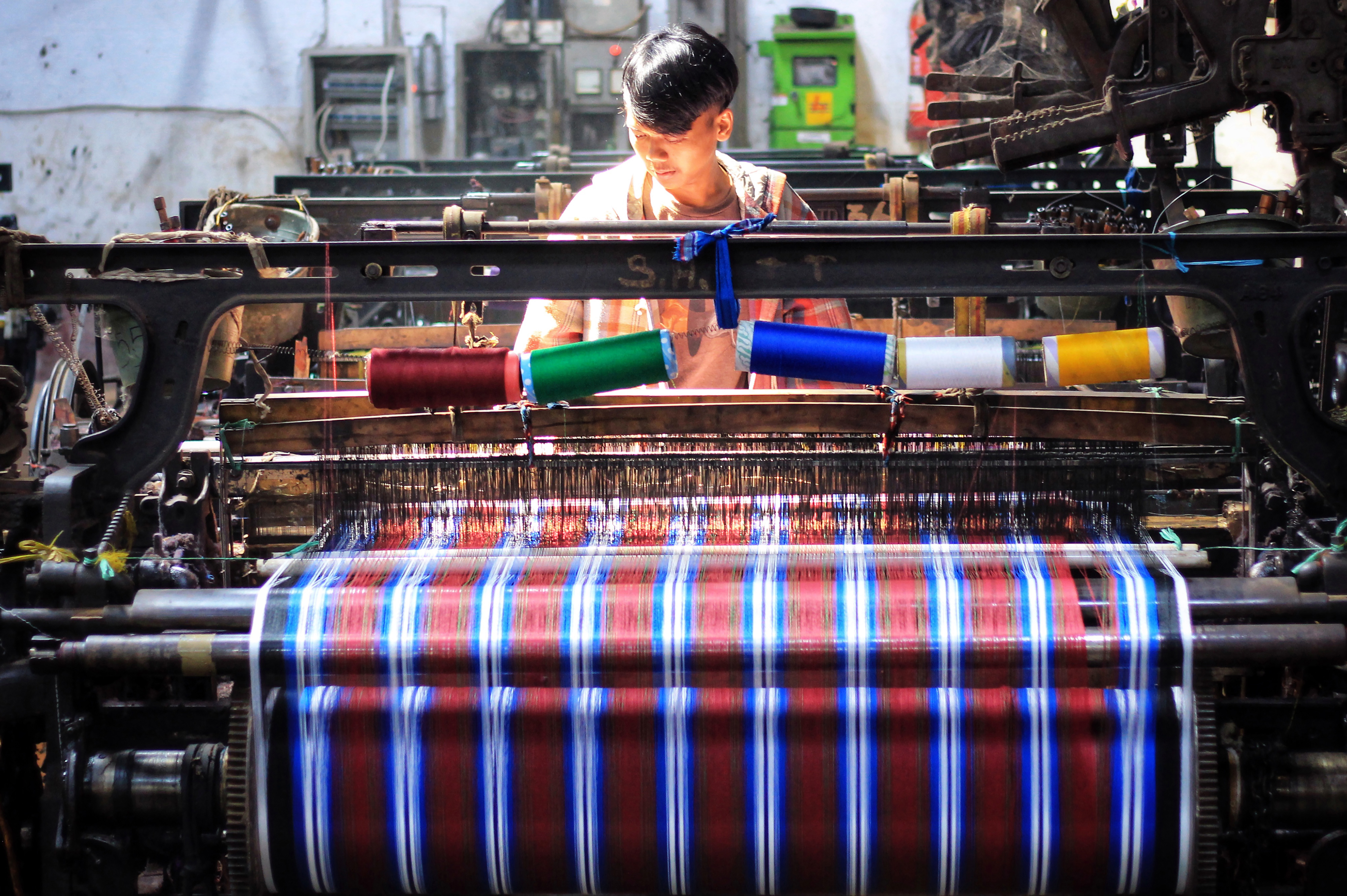
Tenun Majalaya (Sundanese)

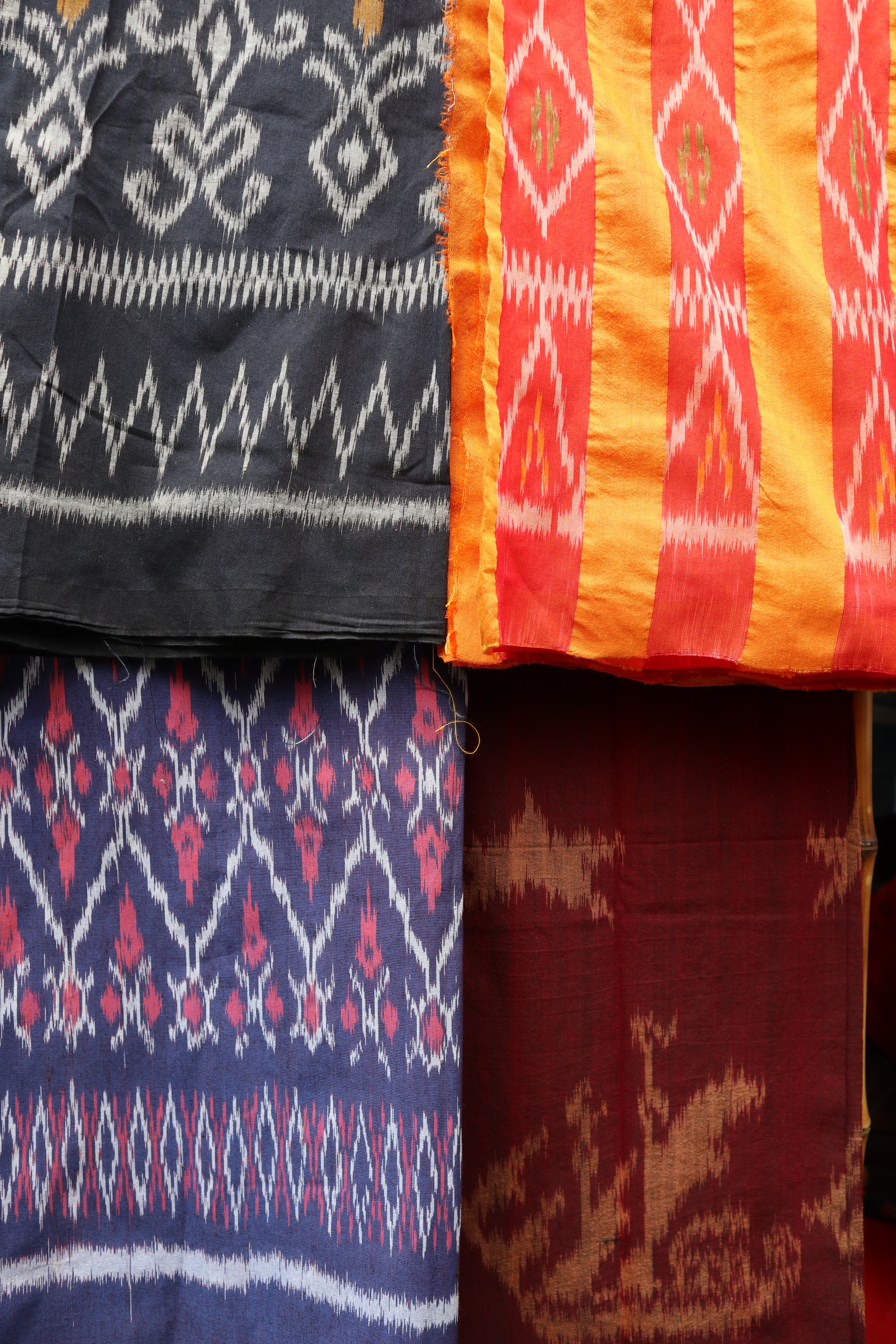
Tenun Pagatan (Banjarese)

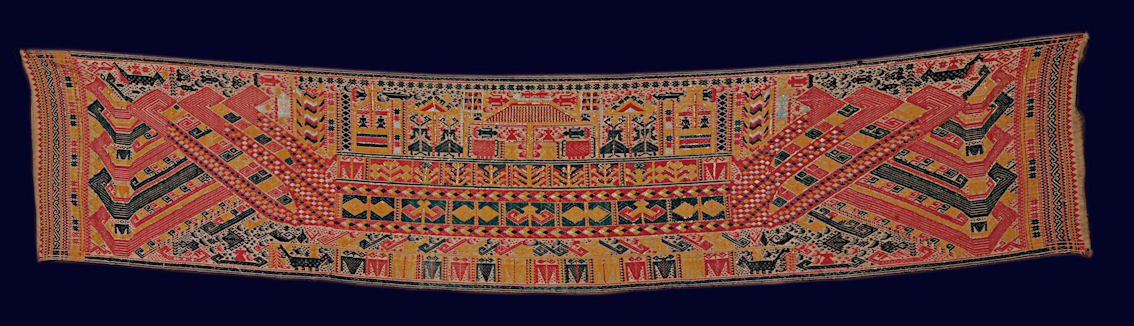
Palepai (Lampung)

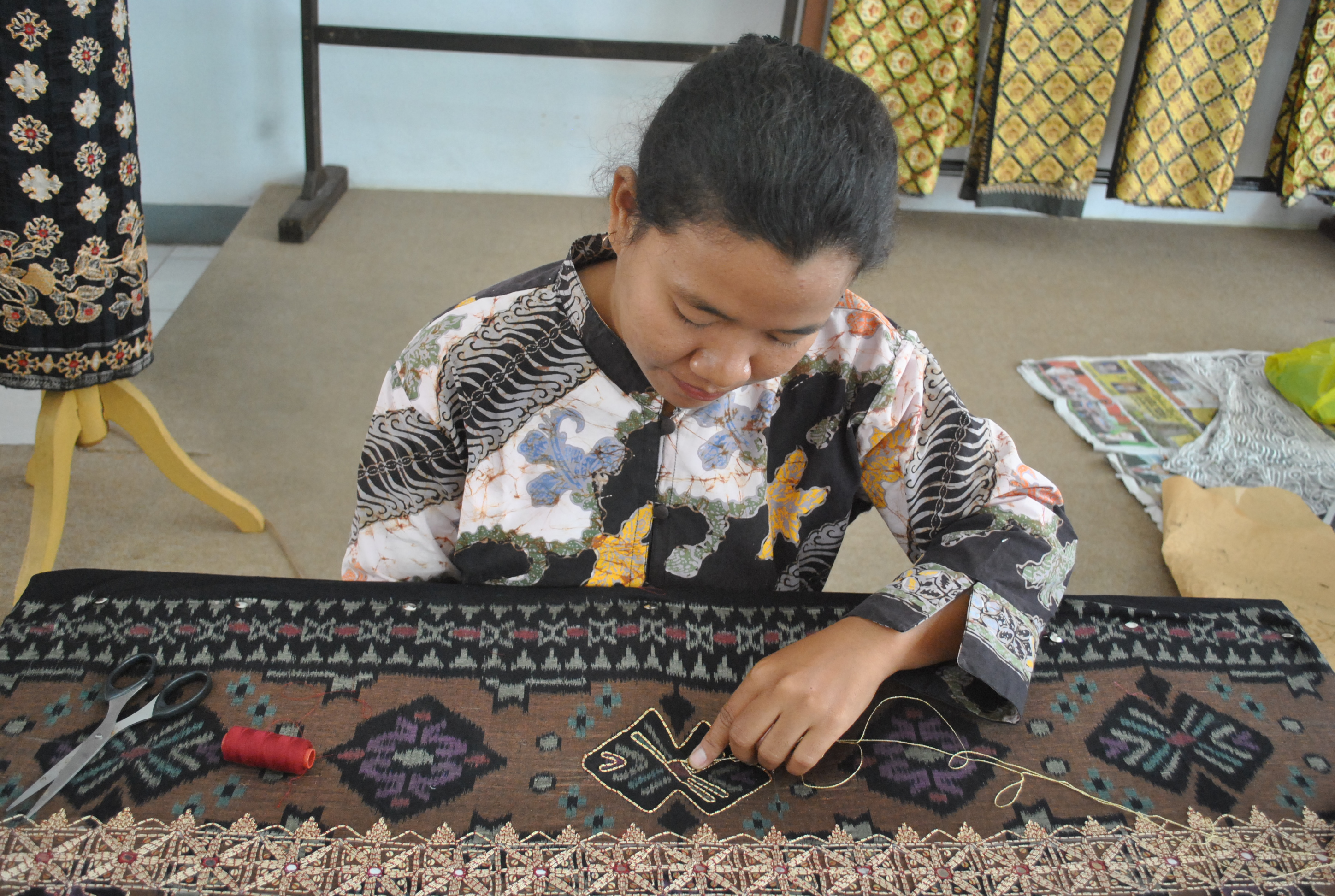
Tapis (Lampung)

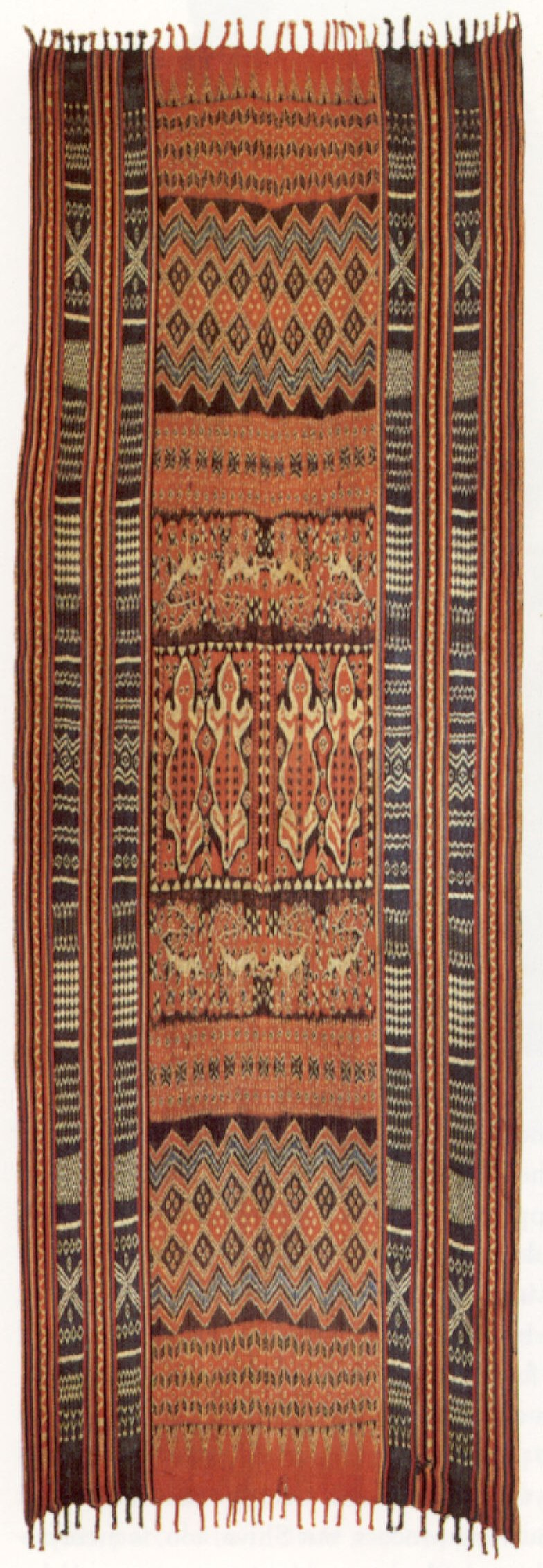
Porilonjong (Rongkong)

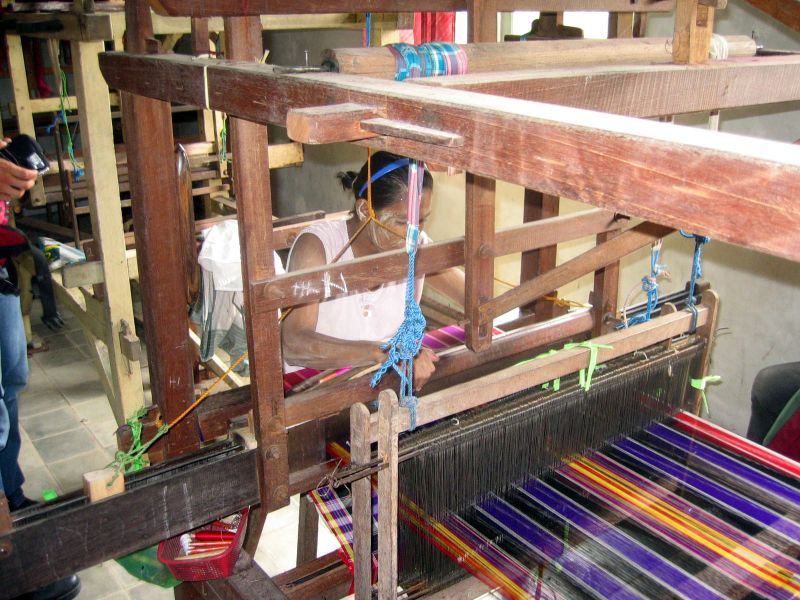
Tenun Samarinda (Kutainese)

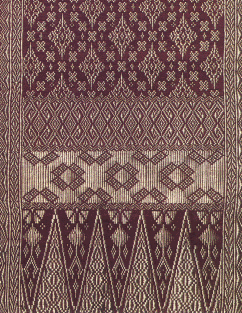
Songket (Malays)

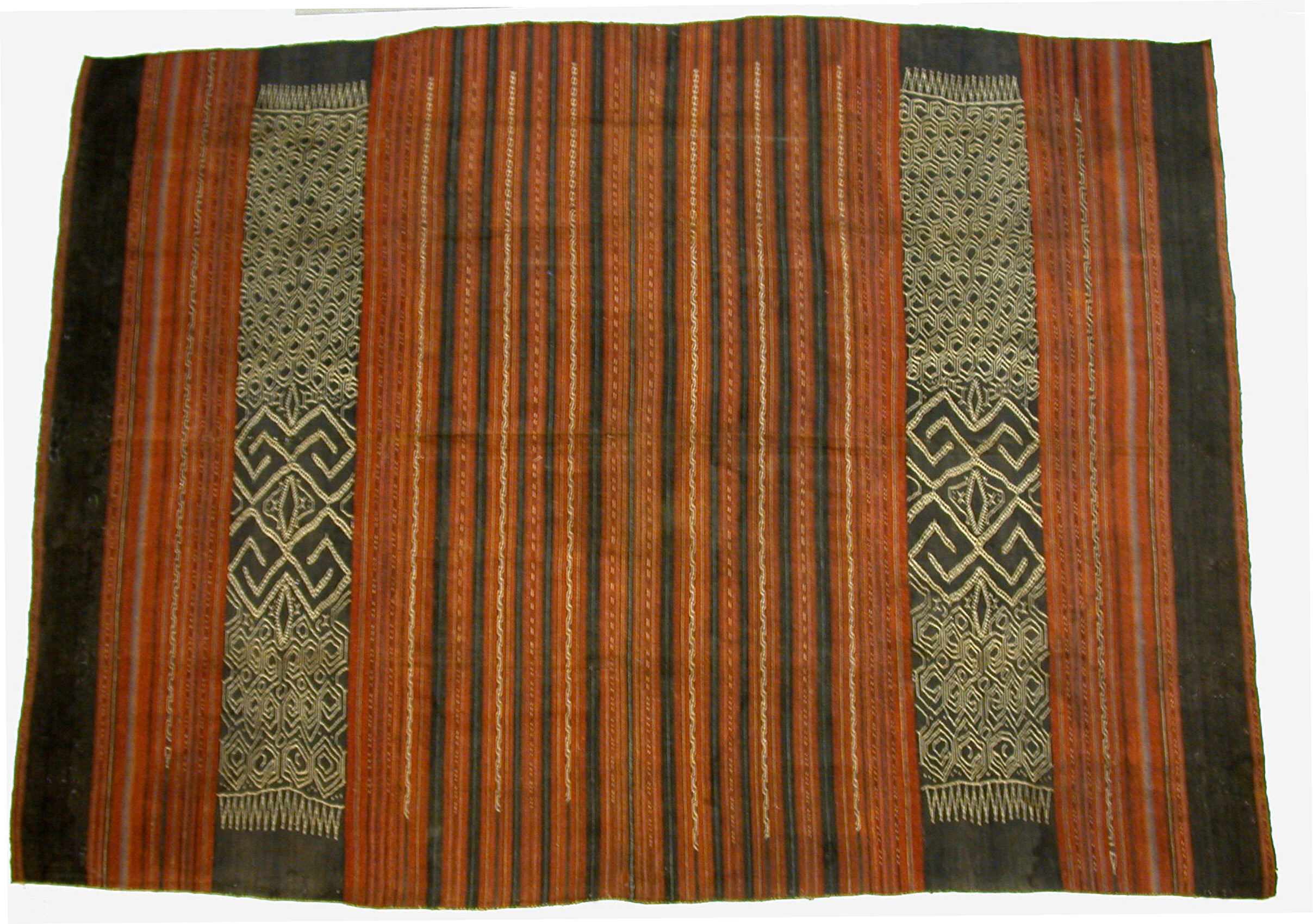
Sora Langi (Torajan)

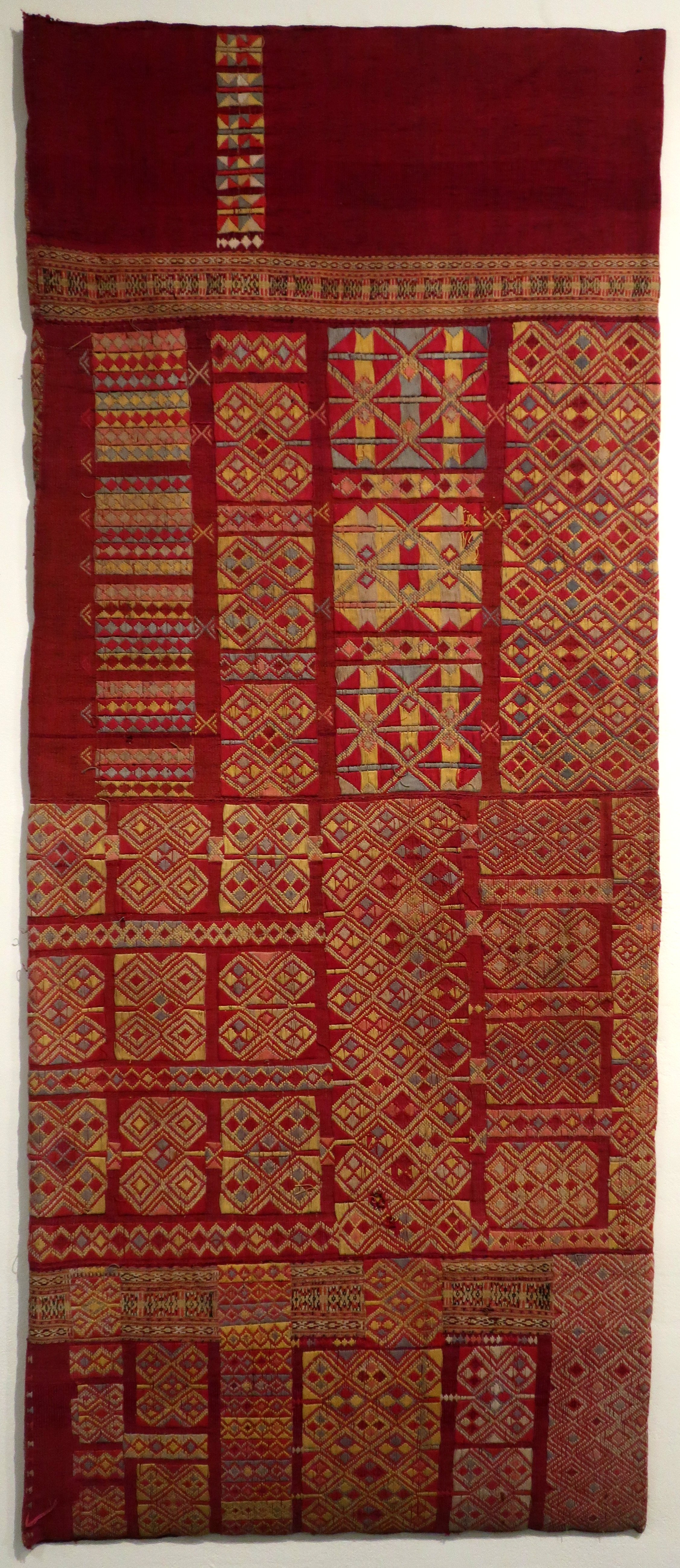
Tais (Atoni)

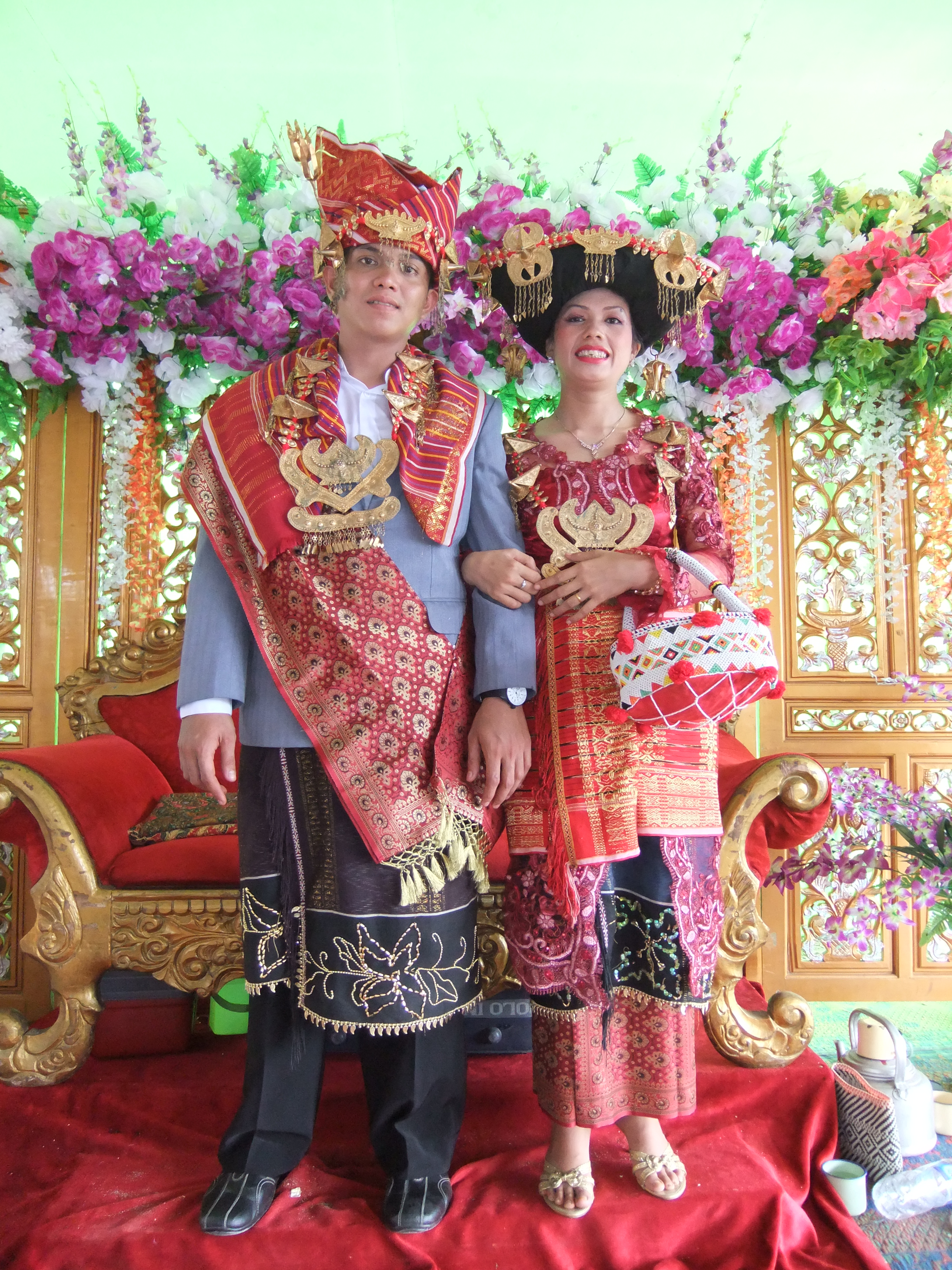
Uis (Karonese)

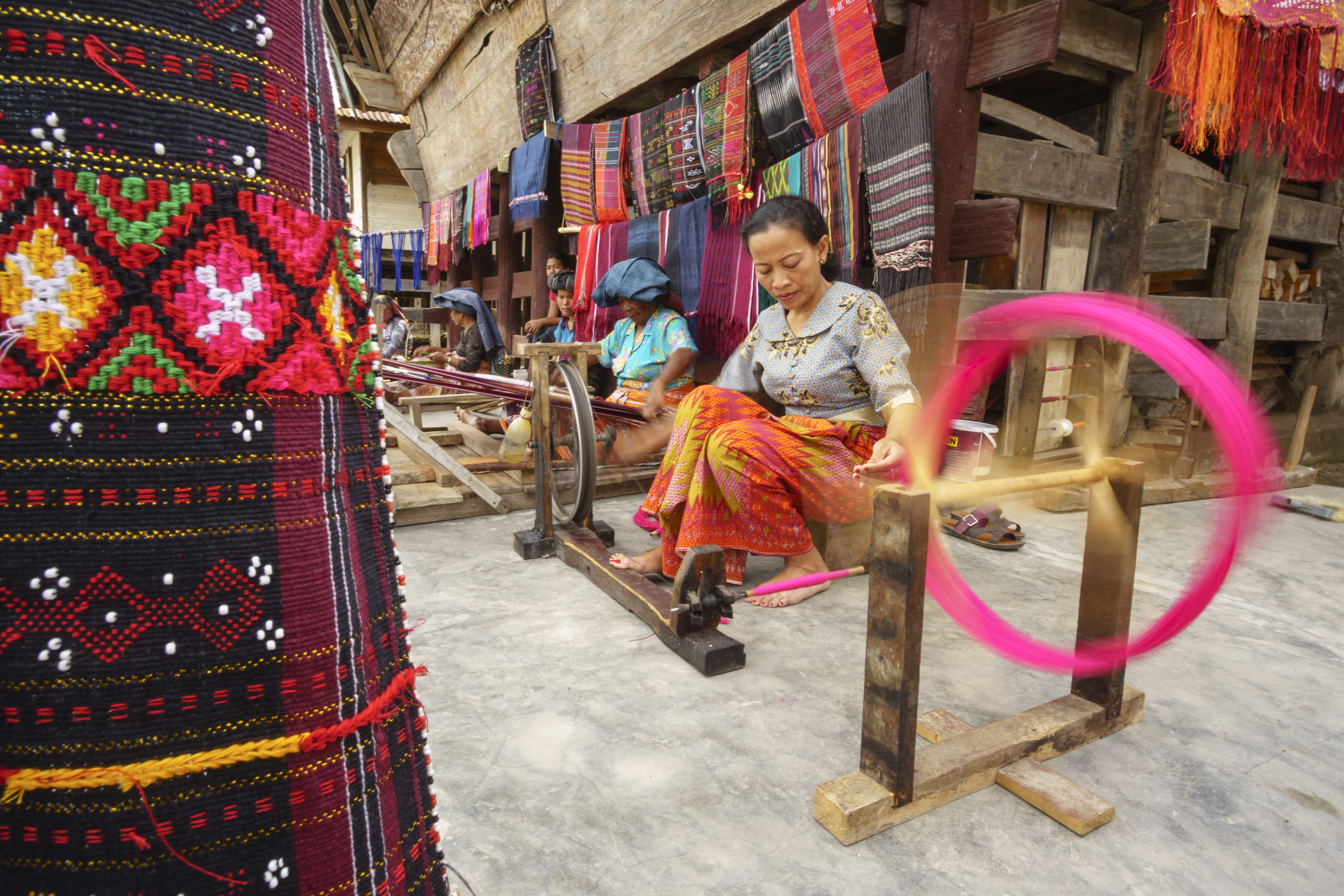
Ulos (Toba Batak)

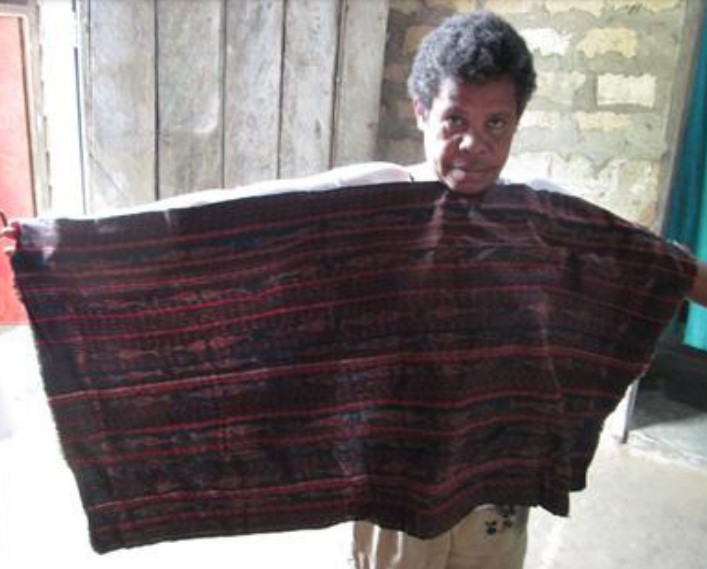
Kain Timor (Moi)

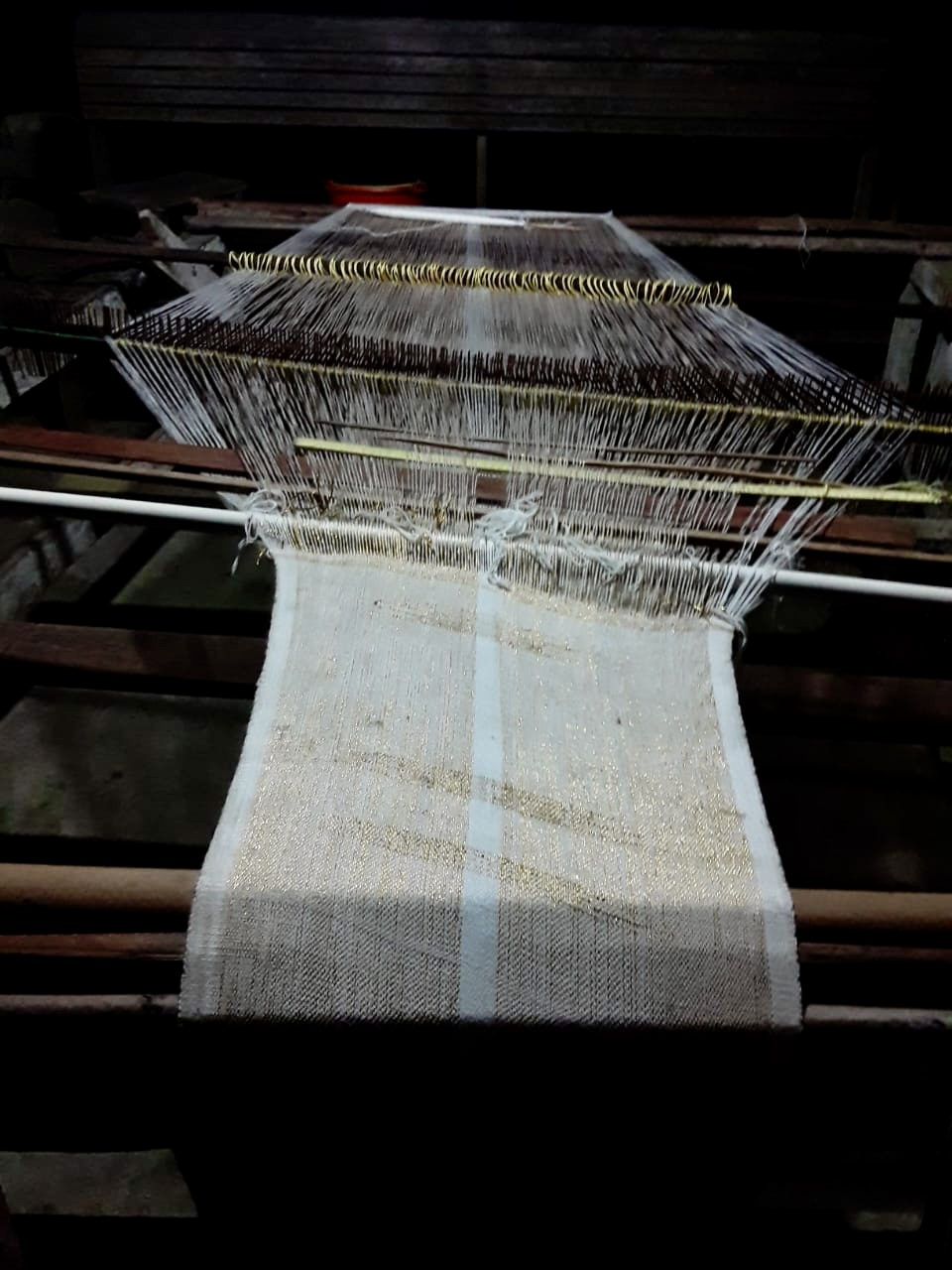
Tenun Terfo (Sarmi)

== See also ==
- Culture of Indonesia
- Art of Indonesia

== Bibliography ==
- Indonesia, Cita Tenun (2010). Tenun: Handwoven Textiles of Indonesia. Tuttle. p. 191. ISBN 978-602-97473-0-0. Archived from the original on June 18, 2022.
- Tenun Ikat: Indonesia's Ikat Weaving Traditions. National Library of Australia. 2009.
