= Tenun Ulap Doyo =

Woven art cloth

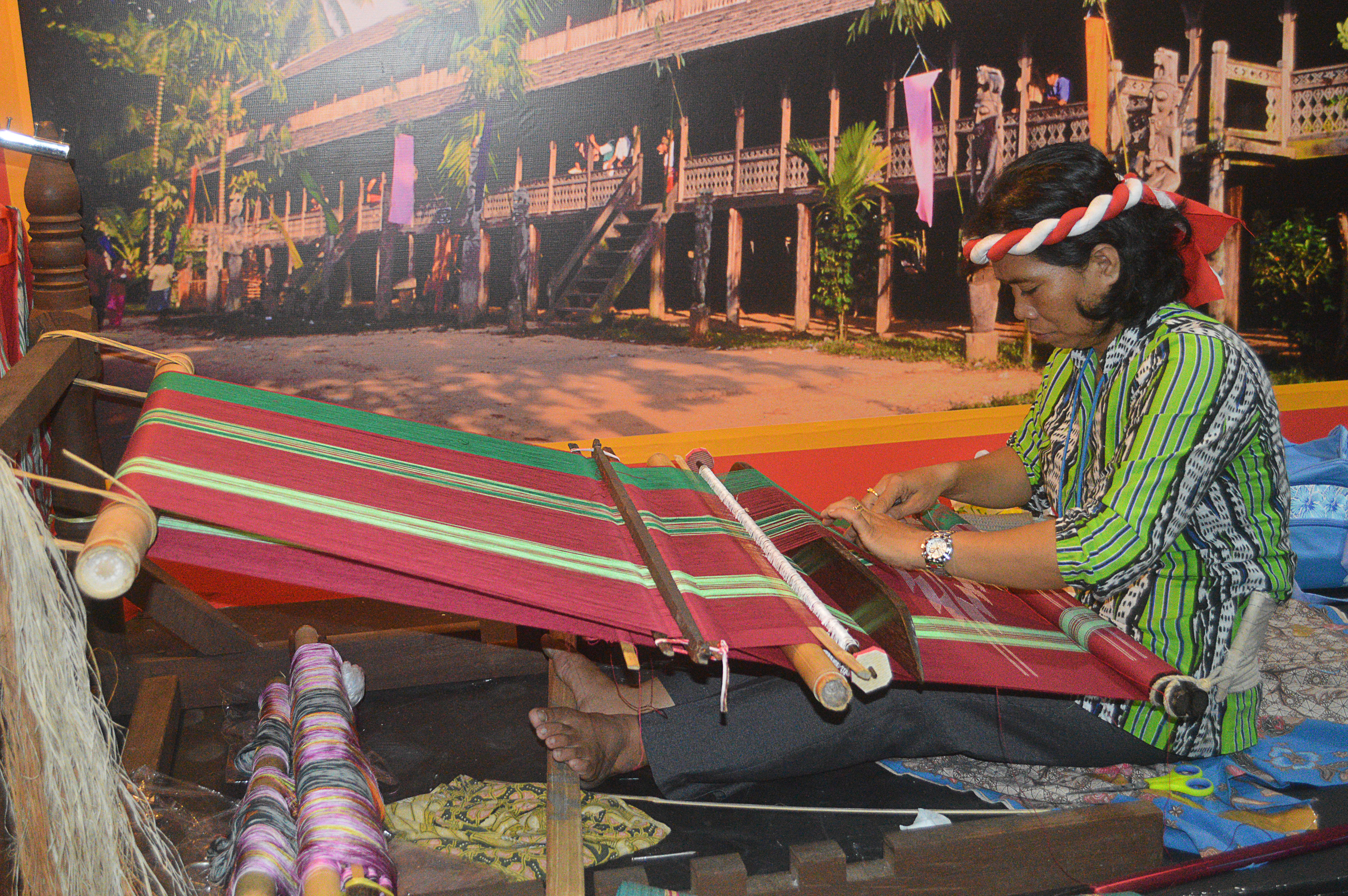
- A Dayak woman is weaving Ulap Doyo
- Type: Art Fabric
- Material: silk and cotton
- Place of origin: East Kalimantan, Indonesia

Ulap Doyo is a woven art cloth of the Benuaq people in Tanjung Isuy, West Kutai Regency, East Kalimantan. Its main ingredient is fiber leaf Doyo. Doyo leaf was chosen as woven material as it offers strong fiber for use as thread. Benuaq tribal women weave clothing, bags, and wallets.

== See also ==
- Tenun
- Ikat
- National costume of Indonesia
