= Bumiayu temple =

Hindu temple in South Sumatra, Indonesia

Bumiayu Temple Compound
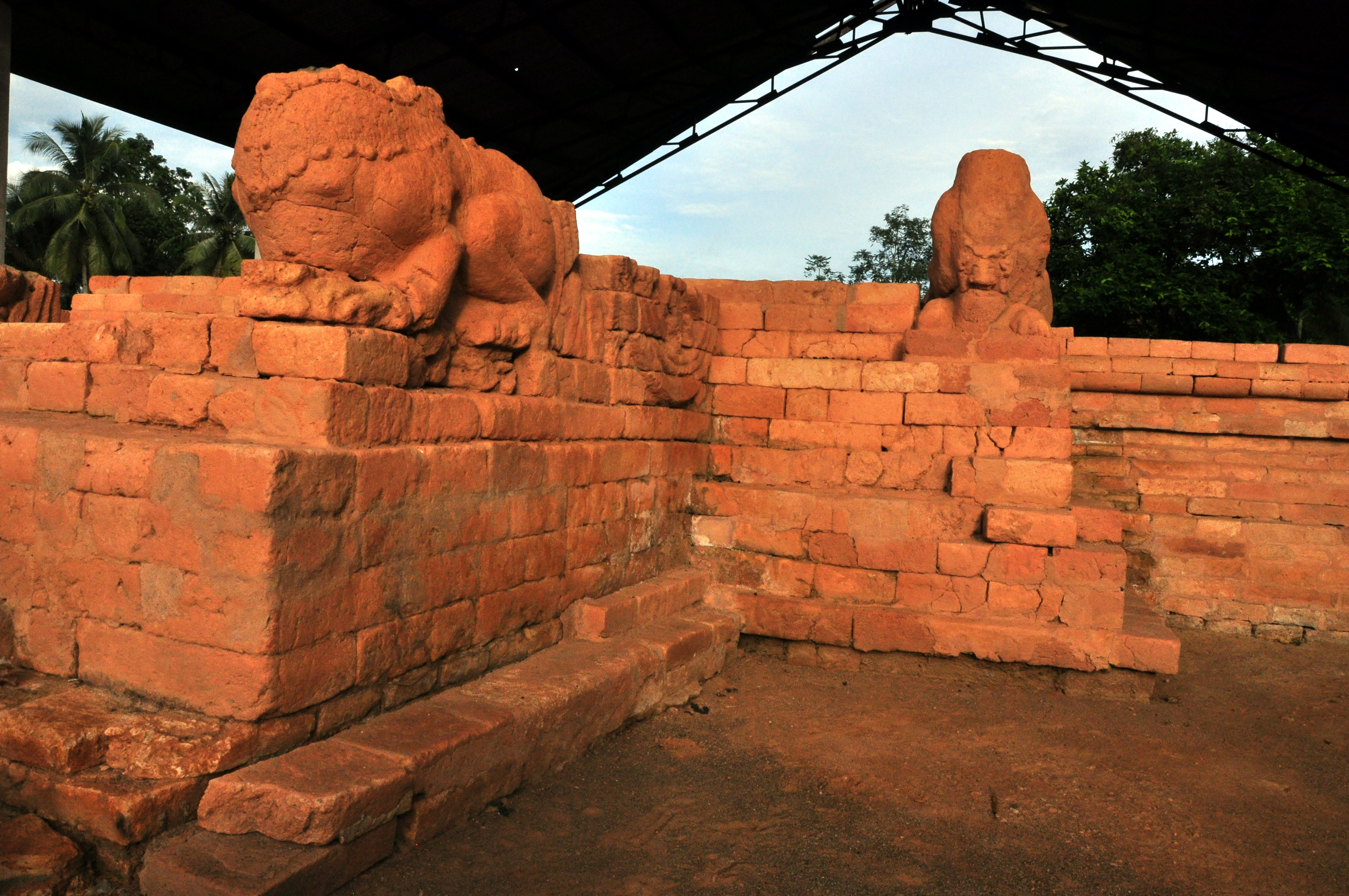
- Bumiayu temple ruins

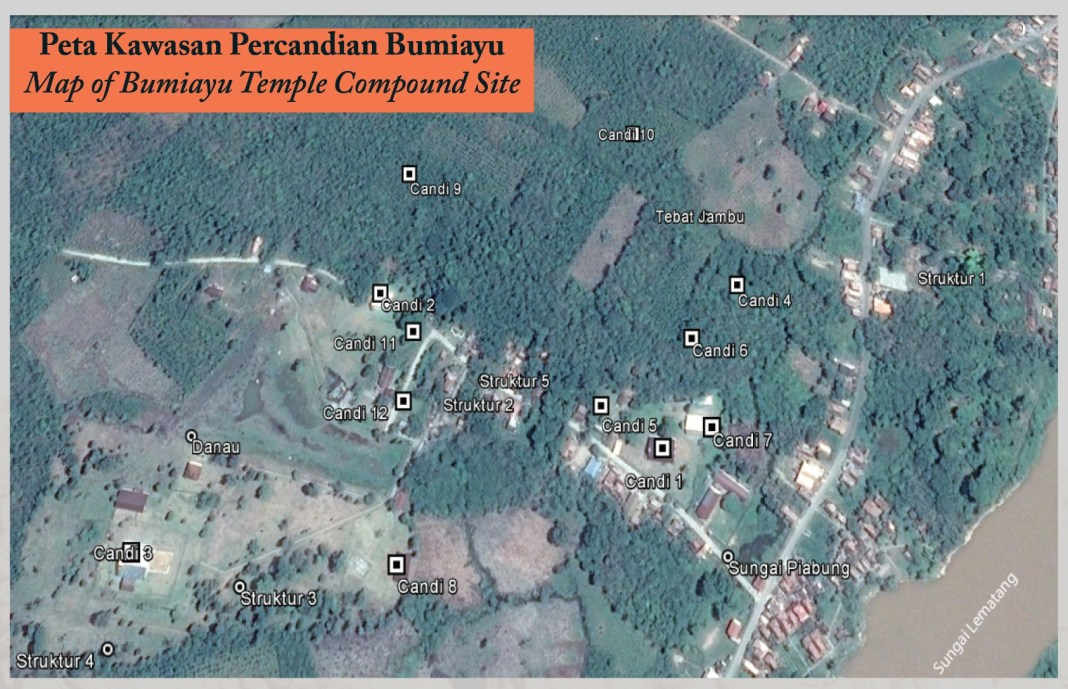
- 3.348033°S 104.088745°E
- Type: Temple compounds
- Periods: Hindu-Buddhist
- Cultures: Srivijaya
- Location: Penukal Abab Lematang Ilir Regency, South Sumatra, Indonesia
- Region: Sumatra

History
- Built: 8th
- Abandoned: 13th-century

Site notes
- Excavation dates: 19th century-present
- Archaeologists: Bambang Budi Utomo

Bumiayu temple compound, or locally known as Candi Bumiayu, is a Sumatran Shivaist Hindu temple complex located near the banks of Lematang river, precisely in Bumiayu village, Tanah Abang district, Penukal Abab Lematang Ilir Regency, South Sumatra, Indonesia. The temple located about 120 kilometres west of Palembang city. The red brick structures are estimated dated from 8th to 13th-century, and linked to the Srivijaya kingdom. Compared to Java, only a few Hindu-Buddhist temple ruins has been rediscovered in Sumatra. The temple is known as one of the few surviving Hindu temple remnant in South Sumatra. Other temple ruins in Sumatra are Muaro Jambi in Jambi, Muara Takus in Riau, and Bahal temple in North Sumatra.

== History ==
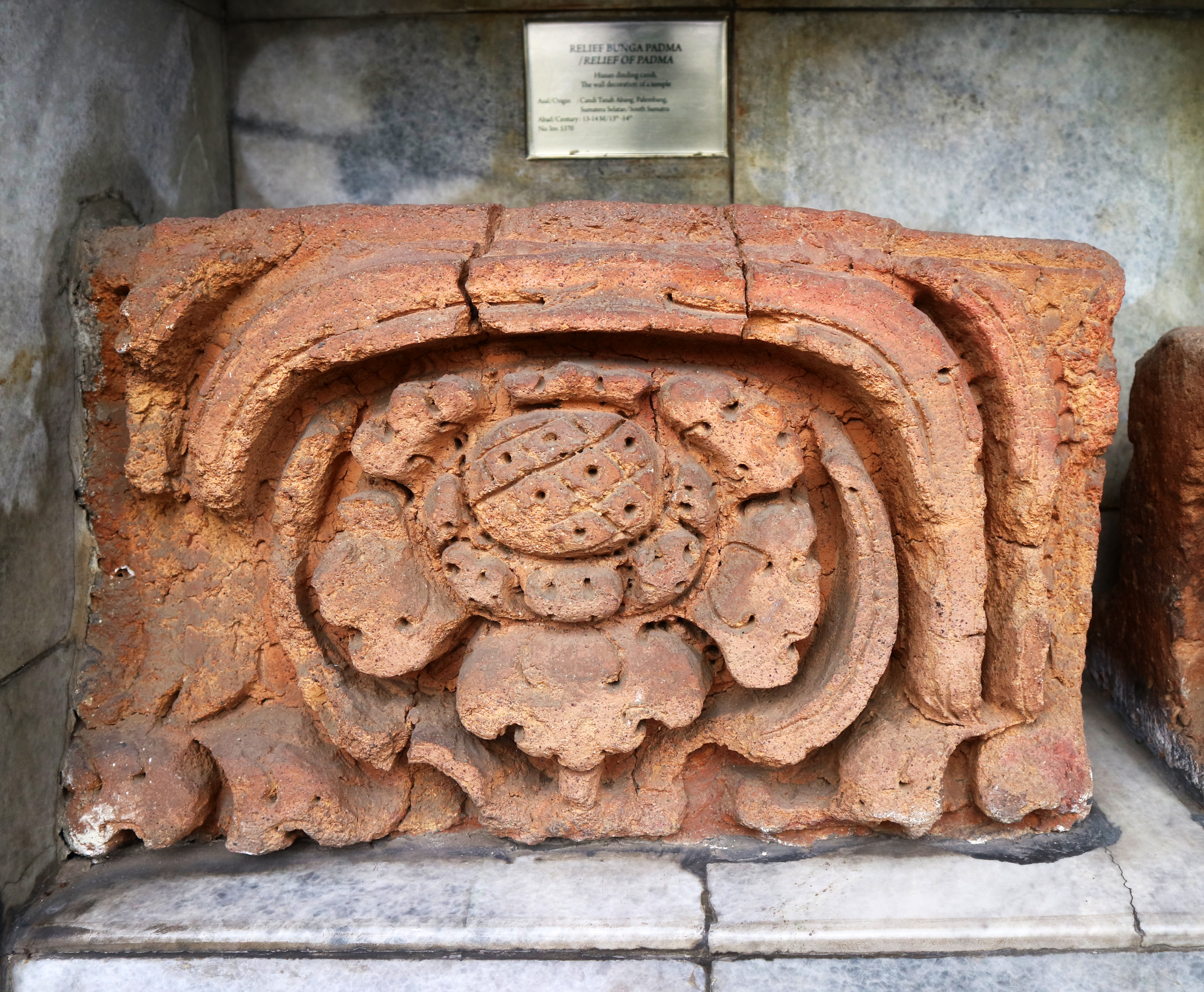
A terracotta padma relief taken from Tanah Abang (Bumiayu) temple, South Sumatra, collection of National Museum.

Historian suggests that the temple compound were built and used in the period between the 8th to 13th century. It is linked to Srivijaya kingdom that centered in Palembang, located to the northeast from the Bumiayu site, connected by Lematang river, a tributary of Musi River.

The Bumiayu temple compound was probably built by a Kedatuan settlement or principality that belongs within Srivijayan mandala sphere of influence. The fact that Hindu temple was discovered within the area of Srivijayan Buddhist empire suggests that the kingdom's population adheres to both Hinduism and Buddhism that coexist harmoniously. According to the styles of Shiva and Agastya statues found in temple 1, those Hindu statues are dated from around the 9th to 10th-century.

By the 12th to 13th-century it seems that the faith was shifted from Hinduism to Tantric Buddhism. This suggestions was based on the discovery of tantric inscription near Lematang river, the statue of Camundi and lions pulling carriages, which is similar to those Tantric statues of Orrissa in India and Singhasari Buddhist statues of East Java. As an indicator of a settlement, the fragments of pottery and Chinese ceramics dated from the Song and Yuan dynasties (11-13th century CE) were also found. The settlements site are found on the banks of the Lematang river.

The temple compound was abandoned, probably in the 16th century or earlier, possible due to the arrival of Islam and the conversion of the local population. Subsequently, the temple compound were forgotten, buried under earth and tropical jungle.

The rediscovery of the Bumiayu archaeological site was first reported by E.P. Tombrink in 1864 in his report Hindoe Monumenten in de Bovenlanden van Palembang. During his visit to Lematang Ulu, he reported that there are 26 Hindu statues relics, including the statue of Nandi. In Lematang Ilir, there are ruins of a temple near Tanah Abang hamlet, and a relief of a parrot which is now kept in the National Museum.

According to local story that been recorded by a Dutch controller named A.J. Knaap in 1902, what is now called the Bumiayu temple is the former palace of a kingdom called Gedebong Undang. Furthermore, Knaap reported in 1904 the archaeological remnants of the site; a 1.75 meter high brick building was found in the Lematang area. part from brick temple ruins, stone and metal statues were also found. Another finding was a gold sheet that read om yam. The temple were reconstructed in the 1990s, although not complete since many parts of temple were ruined and many bricks are missing.

== Temple structure ==
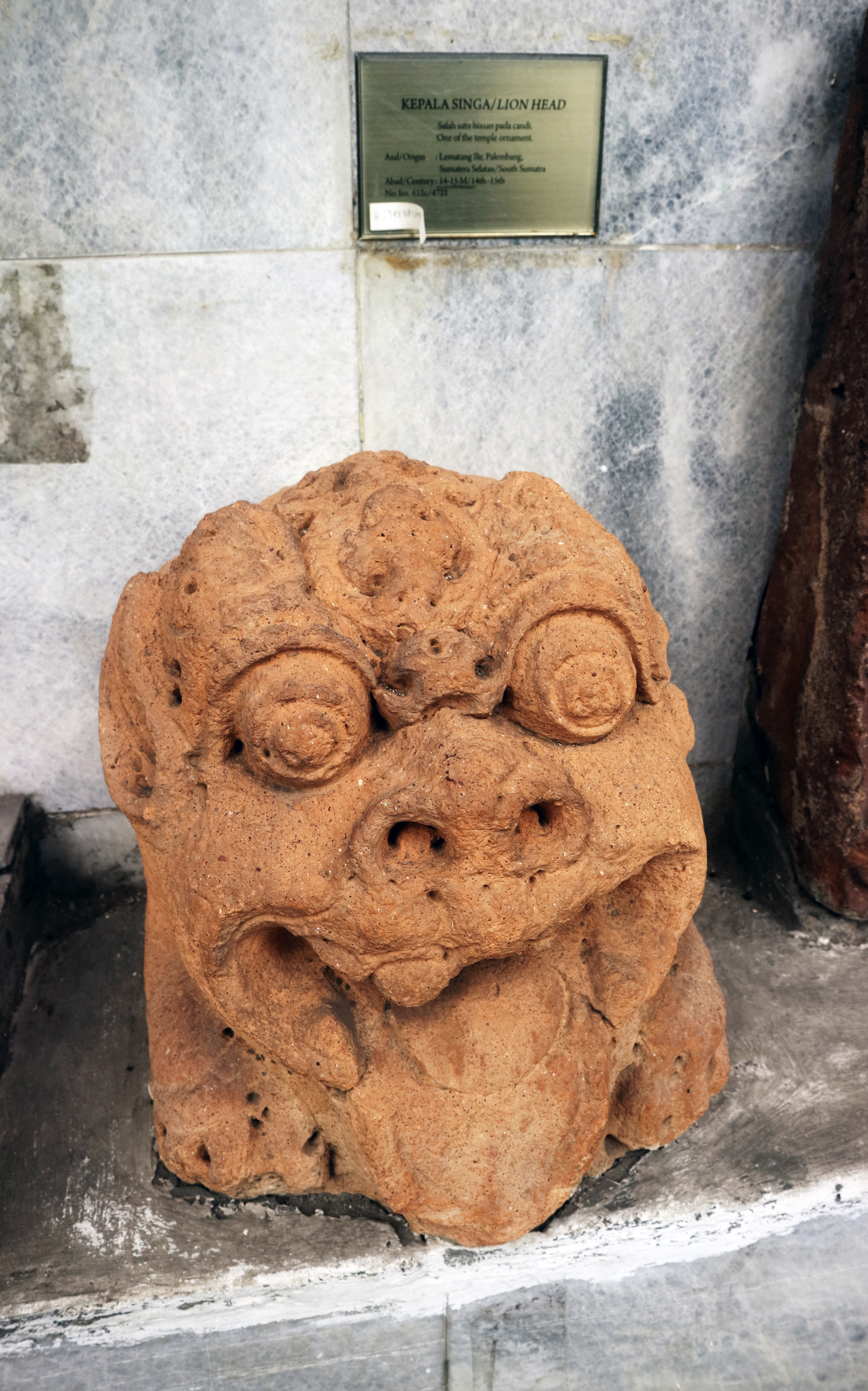
A terracotta figure of lion head, one of a temple ornament discovered in Lematang Ilir, South Sumatra, collection of National Museum.

Bumiayu temple site covering an area of about 15 hectares, which is bordered by 7 perimeter ditch. The temple complex consists of 13 red brick structures that most of them are now in ruins in form of earth mounds. Only 5 structures has been reconstructed; temple 1, 2, 3, 7 and 8. Only temple 1 is located in the center of the village, the rest is scattered around the village or within the rubber plantation.

=== Temple 1 ===
The temple 1 has a square plan with a size of 10.21 x 10.47 meters and the ascending stairs located on the east side. On the left and right of the stairs are decorated with carriages drawn by lion that is now headless. At the front of the ascending stairs are the remains of a pavilion. Several statues were found from the ruins of temple 1, namely the statue of Shiva Mahadeva, Agastya, the statue of Gajasimha, two figures, and the statue of Nandi.

=== Temple 3 ===
Temple 3 is a group of buildings consisting of a main temple and three perwara (ancillary) temples, each of which is located in the north, east, and south. Based on the location of the stairs, the main temple building faces northeast. The main temple building has an octagonal design that stands on the rectangular base. From the temple 3 ruins, there were found fragments of the demon's head, a statue of a woman torso wearing a skull shaped necklace, a statue of a woman holding a snake, and several animal statues of lions, crocodiles, dogs and snakes. In temple 3 there are some exquisite and detailed terracotta relief depicts kala and makara with rich decorations.

The reconstructed temple ruins are now covered with roofs to protect the red brick structures from torrential rains. Some of statues and relics discovered in Bumiayu temple compound are now stored in an in situ gallery, also in Balaputradeva Museum and Srivijaya Museum in Palembang, while some artefact are kept in National Museum in Jakarta.

== See also ==
- Candi of Indonesia
