= Culture of Malaysia =

The Culture of Malaysia draws on the varied cultures of the different people of Malaysia. The first people to live in the area were indigenous tribes that still remain; they were followed by the Malays, who moved there from mainland Asia in ancient times. Chinese and Indian cultural influences made their mark when trade began with those countries, and increased with immigration to Malaysia. Other cultures that heavily influenced that of Malaysia include Persian, Arabic and British. The many different ethnicities that currently exist in Malaysia have their own unique and distinctive cultural identities, with some crossover.

Arts and music have a long tradition in Malaysia, with Malay art dating back to the Malay sultanates. Traditional art was centred on fields such as carving, silversmithing, and weaving. Islamic taboos restricted artwork depicting humans until the mid-20th century. Performing arts and shadow puppet shows are popular, and often show Indian influences. Various influences can be seen in architecture, from individual cultures in Malaysia and from other countries. Large modern structures have been built, including the tallest twin buildings in the world, the Petronas Twin Towers. Malaysian music has a variety of origins, and is largely based around percussion instruments. Much early Malaysian literature was based on Indian epics, which remained unchanged even as Malays converted to Islam; this has expanded in recent decades. English literature remained restricted to the higher class until the arrival of the printing press. Locally created Chinese and Indian literature appeared in the 19th century.

Cuisine is often divided along ethnic lines, but some dishes exist which have mixed foods from different ethnicities. Each major religious group has its major holy days declared as official holidays. Official holidays differ by state; the most widespread one is Merdeka day which celebrates the independence of Malaya. Although festivals often stem from a specific ethnic background, they are celebrated by all people in Malaysia. Traditional sports are popular in Malaysia, while it has become a powerhouse in international sports such as badminton. Malaysia hosted the Commonwealth Games in 1998, the first Commonwealth Games where the torch passed through more countries than England and the host.

The Malaysian government has taken the step of defining Malaysian Culture through the "1971 National Culture Policy", which defined what was considered official culture, basing it around Malay culture and integrating Islamic influences. This especially affected language; only Malay texts are considered official cultural texts. Government control over the media is strong, and most media outlets are related to the government in some way.

== History ==
Early cultural influences came from Indian traders. In the 15th Century a group of Sumatran refugees settled, and established what became the Malaccan Sultanate. Traders from many surrounding states, including Arabs, Persians and Chinese, visited and settled there also. On 1st September 1509, Diego Lopez de Sequeira led a fleet of five ships into Malacca, and Malacca became a Portuguese colony in 1511. By the early 17th Century the Netherlands was establishing dominance over the region, and in 1641 the Dutch gained control over Malacca. In 1824 the British negotiated with the Dutch, and took control of Malacca in exchange for territories in what is now Indonesia. The British established Singapore as a free port, attracting Chinese immigrant labour and leading to the large contingent of Chinese descendants not only in Singapore, but also in the rest of the Malay Peninsula. In the early years of the 20th Century the British recruited Indian labour to work on estates, leading to a significant largely Tamil population in Malaysia.

== Background ==
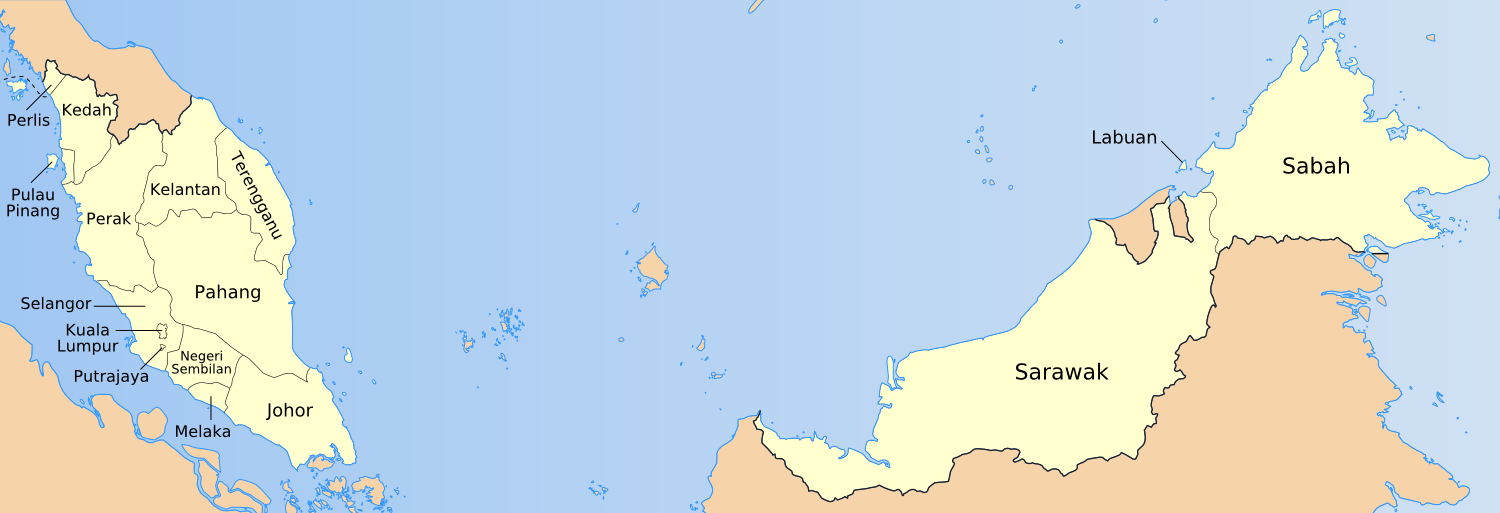
Peninsular Malaysia (left) is 40% of Malaysia's territory, and East Malaysia (right) is 60% of Malaysia's territory. The capital of Malaysia is Kuala Lumpur.

Malaysia consists of two distinct geographical regions: Peninsular Malaysia and East Malaysia. Malaysia was formed when the Federation of Malaya merged with North Borneo (today the province of Sabah), Sarawak, and Singapore (seceded 1965) in 1963, and cultural differences between Peninsular and East Malaysia remain. During the formation of Malaysia, executive power was vested in the Perikatan (later the Barisan Nasional) coalition of three racially based political parties, namely the United Malays National Organisation (UMNO), Malaysian Chinese Association (MCA), and Malaysian Indian Congress (MIC). UMNO has dominated the coalition from its inception. Although Islam is the official state religion, the Constitution of Malaysia guarantees freedom of religion.

=== Ethnic groups ===
Malaysia is a multi–ethnic, multicultural, and multilingual society, and the many ethnic groups in Malaysia maintain separate cultural identities. The society of Malaysia has been described as "Asia in miniature". The original culture of the area stemmed from its indigenous tribes, along with the Malays who moved there in ancient times. Substantial influence exists from the Chinese and Indian cultures, dating back to when trade with those countries began in the area. Other cultures that heavily influenced that of Malaysia include Persian, Arabic, and British. The structure of the government, along with the racial balance of power caused by the idea of a social contract, has resulted in little incentive for the cultural assimilation of ethnic minorities in Malaya and Malaysia. The government has historically made little distinction between "Malay culture" and "Malaysian culture".

The Malays, who account for over half the Malaysian population, play a dominant role politically and are included in a grouping identified as bumiputra. Their native language, Bahasa Malaysia, is the national language of the country. By definition of the Malaysian constitution, all Malays are Muslims. The Orang Asal, the earliest inhabitants of Malaya, formed only 0.5 percent of the total population in Malaysia in 2000, but represented a majority in East Malaysia, Borneo. In Sarawak and Sabah, most of the non-Muslim indigenous groups are classified as Dayaks, and they constitute about 40 percent of the population in the state. Many tribes have converted to Christianity. The 140,000 Orang Asli, or aboriginal peoples, comprise a number of different ethnic communities living in peninsular Malaysia.

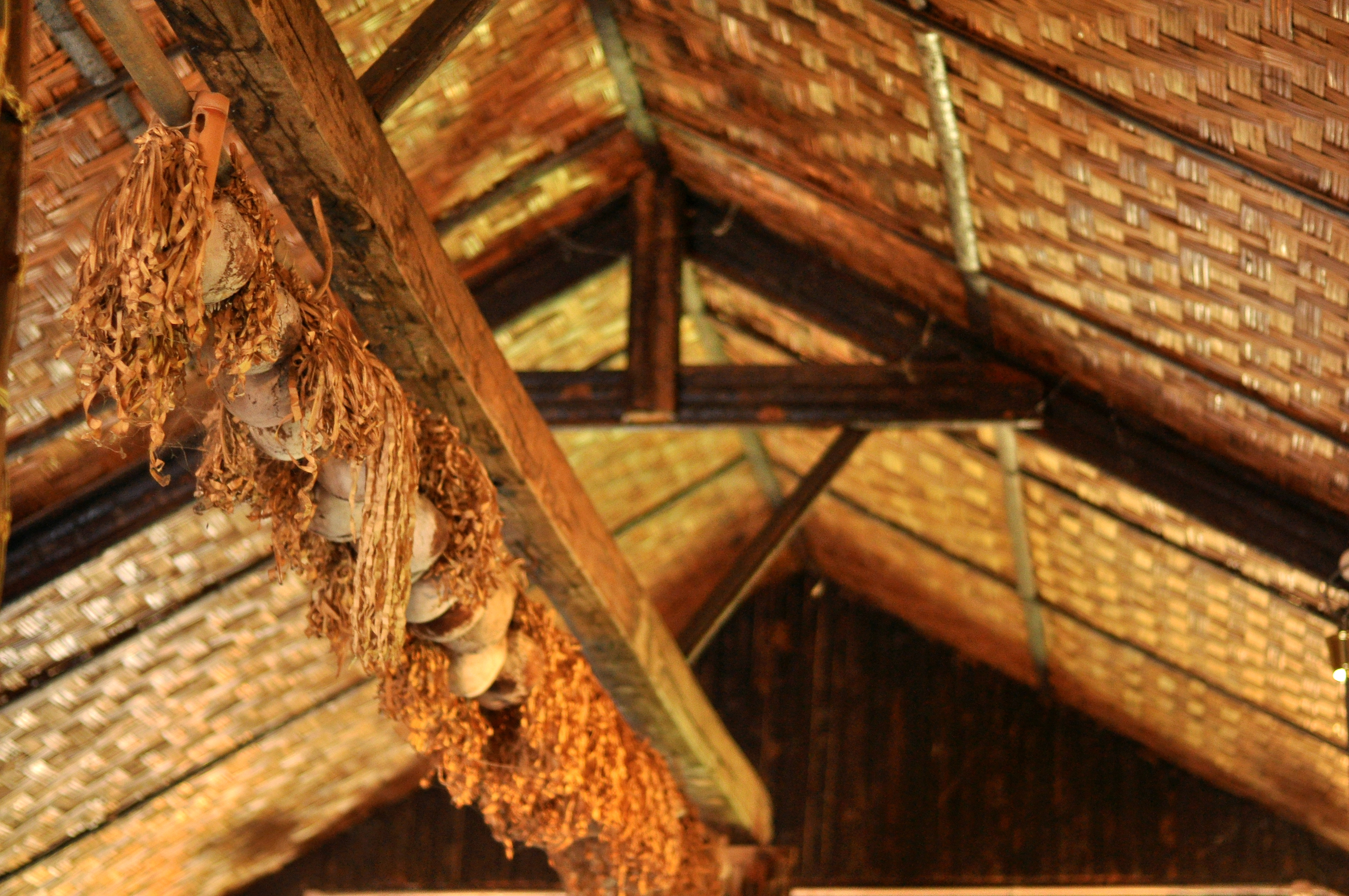
Heads from old headhunting practices in a Kadazan house in Sabah

The Chinese have been settling in Malaysia for many centuries, and form the second-largest ethnic group. The first Chinese to settle in the Straits Settlements, primarily in and around Malacca, gradually adopted elements of Malaysian culture and intermarried with the Malaysian community and with this, a new ethnic group called emerged, the Peranakan ("Straits Chinese"). These Chinese have adopted Malay traditions while maintaining elements of Chinese culture such as their largely Buddhist and Taoist religion. The more common Chinese varieties spoken in Peninsular Malaysia are Cantonese, Mandarin, Hokkien, Hakka, Hainanese, and Fuzhou.

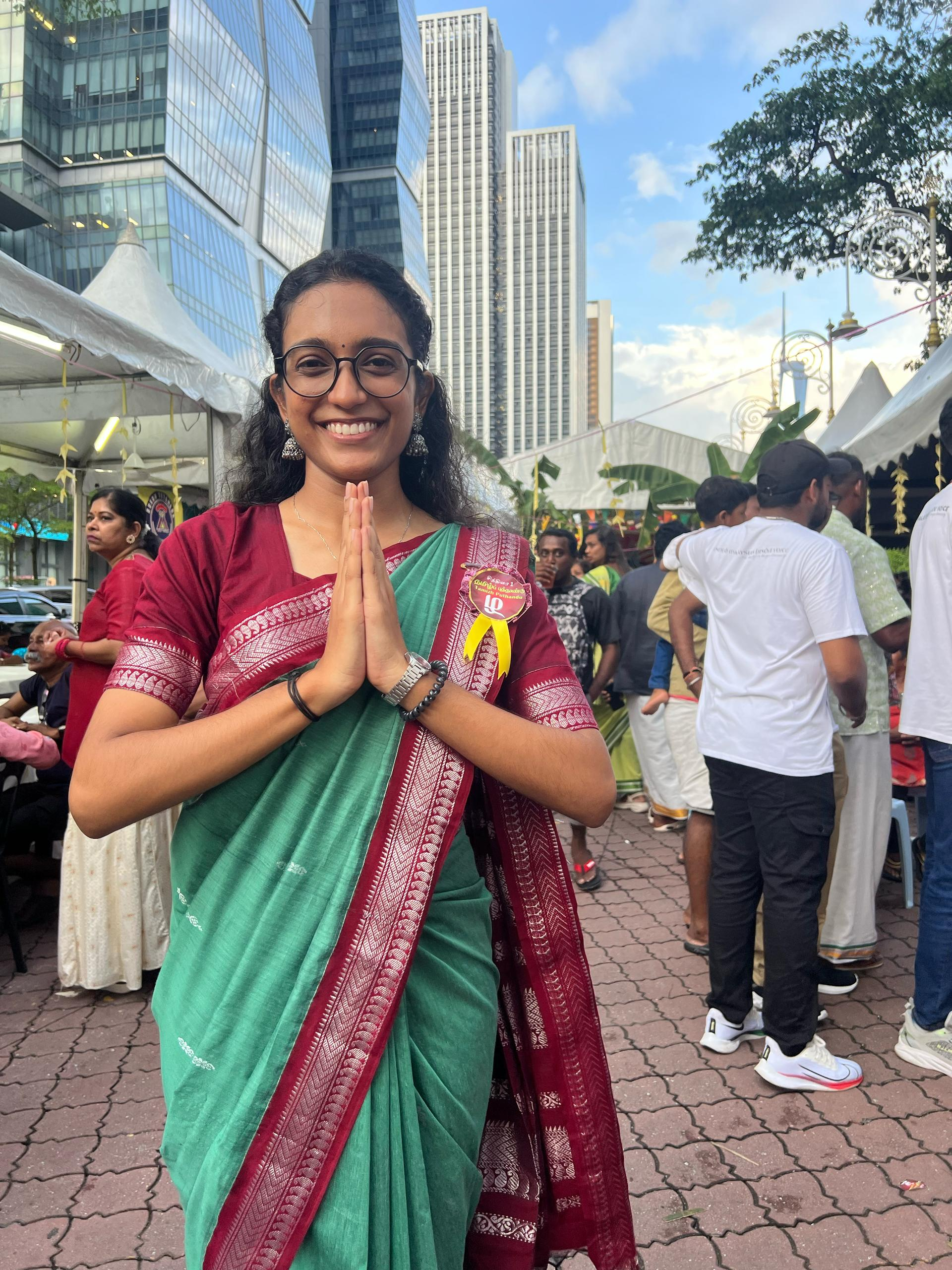
Malaysian Indian young women in traditional attire, Saree.

The Indian community in Malaysia is the smallest of the three main ethnic groups, accounting for about 10 percent of the country's population. They speak a variety of South Asian languages. Tamils, Malayalees, and Telugu people make up over 85 percent of the people of Indian origin in the country. Indian immigrants to Malaysia brought with them the Hindu and Sikh cultures. This included temples and Gurdwaras, cuisine, and clothing. Hindu tradition remains strong in the Indian community of Malaysia. A community of Indians who have adopted Malay cultural practices also exists in Malacca. Though they remain Hindu, the Chitties speak Bahasa Malaysia and dress and act as Malays.

Some Eurasians of mixed European and Malay descent live in Malaysia. A small community in Malacca are descendants of former Portuguese colonists who married Malay women. While they have adopted Malay culture, they speak their own language and are Catholics.

Each ethnic group has its own underlying culture that separates it from the others, and they have achieved different levels of integration. The Chinese have integrated with Malay culture in a number of areas, including parts of Terengganu, and they form Malayanised groups such as the Baba Chinese in Malacca and the Sino-Kadazan of Sabah. Their years under combined British rule brought some joint sense of identity to all the ethnic groups, with English ideas and ideals providing some unifying features. A joint Malaysian culture can be seen in the symbiosis of the cultures of the people within it.

=== Policies and controversies ===
The Malaysian government defined Malaysian culture through the issuance of the "1971 National Culture Policy". It defines three principles as guidelines for Malaysian culture: that it is based on the cultures of indigenous people; that if elements from other cultures are judged suitable and reasonable they may be considered Malaysian culture; and that Islam will be an important part of national culture. During Mahathir Mohamad’s tenure as Prime Minister (1981-2003), national identity was further reinforced through the concept of Bangsa Malaysia, introduced as part of Wawasan 2020 (Vision 2020).

Some cultural disputes exist between Malaysia and neighbouring Indonesia. The two countries share a similar cultural heritage, sharing many traditions and items. However, disputes have arisen over things ranging from culinary dishes to Malaysia's national anthem. Strong feelings exist in Indonesia about protecting that nation's national heritage. The rivalry between the two countries began during Konfrontasi just after Malaysian independence, when Indonesia and Malaysia were almost at war. Building resentment since then coupled with the economic success of Malaysia mean these feelings are still strong in Indonesia today. The Malaysian government and the Indonesian government have met to defuse some of the tensions resulting from the overlaps in culture. Feelings are not as strong in Malaysia, where most recognise that many cultural values are shared.

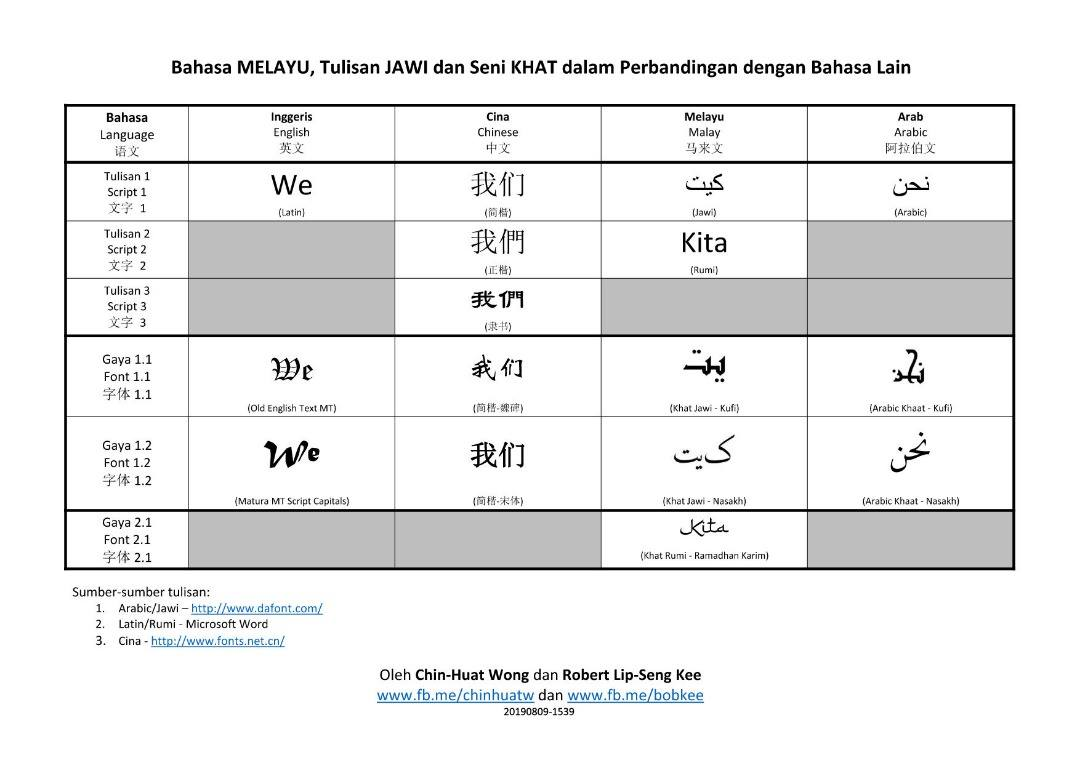
Comparison of Malay language, Jawi writing, and Khat calligraphy with other languages.

One dispute, known as the Pendet controversy, began when Indonesians claimed the Pendet Dance was used in an official Malaysian tourism ad campaign, causing official protests. This dance, from Bali in Indonesia, was used only in a Discovery Channel ad, not an ad sponsored by the Malaysian government. Songs, such as the Rasa Sayange song, have caused similar controversies. The Malaysian national anthem, Negaraku, was claimed to be based on a similar Indonesian song written a year earlier. Both tunes are derived from a 19th century French song, which caused the similarity.

In 2019, plans by the Ministry of Education to introduce of khat (Jawi calligraphy) in the Year 4 Bahasa Melayu syllabus in vernacular schools in the following year became a polemical issue. Certain parties saw the issue as symptoms of creeping Islamisation while others saw it as beneficial towards the appreciation of a cultural heritage.

== Arts ==
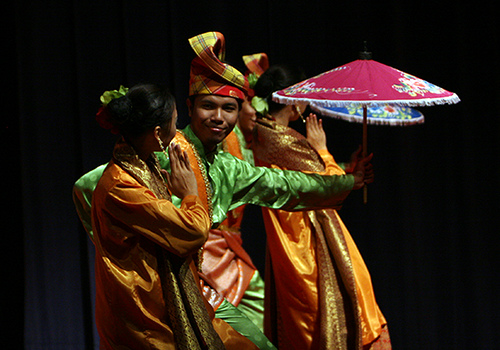
Joget Melayu, a Malay dance

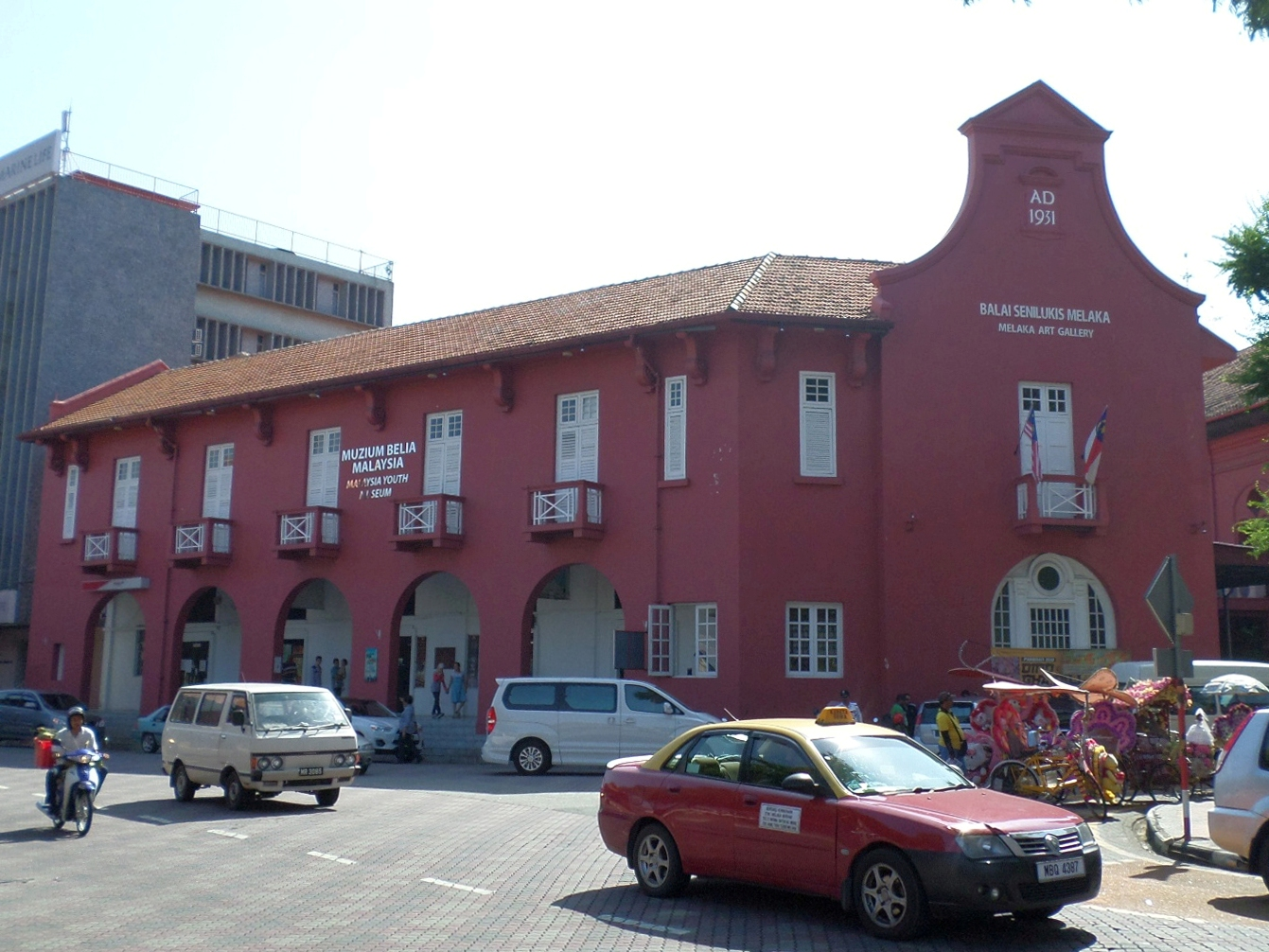
Malacca Art Gallery

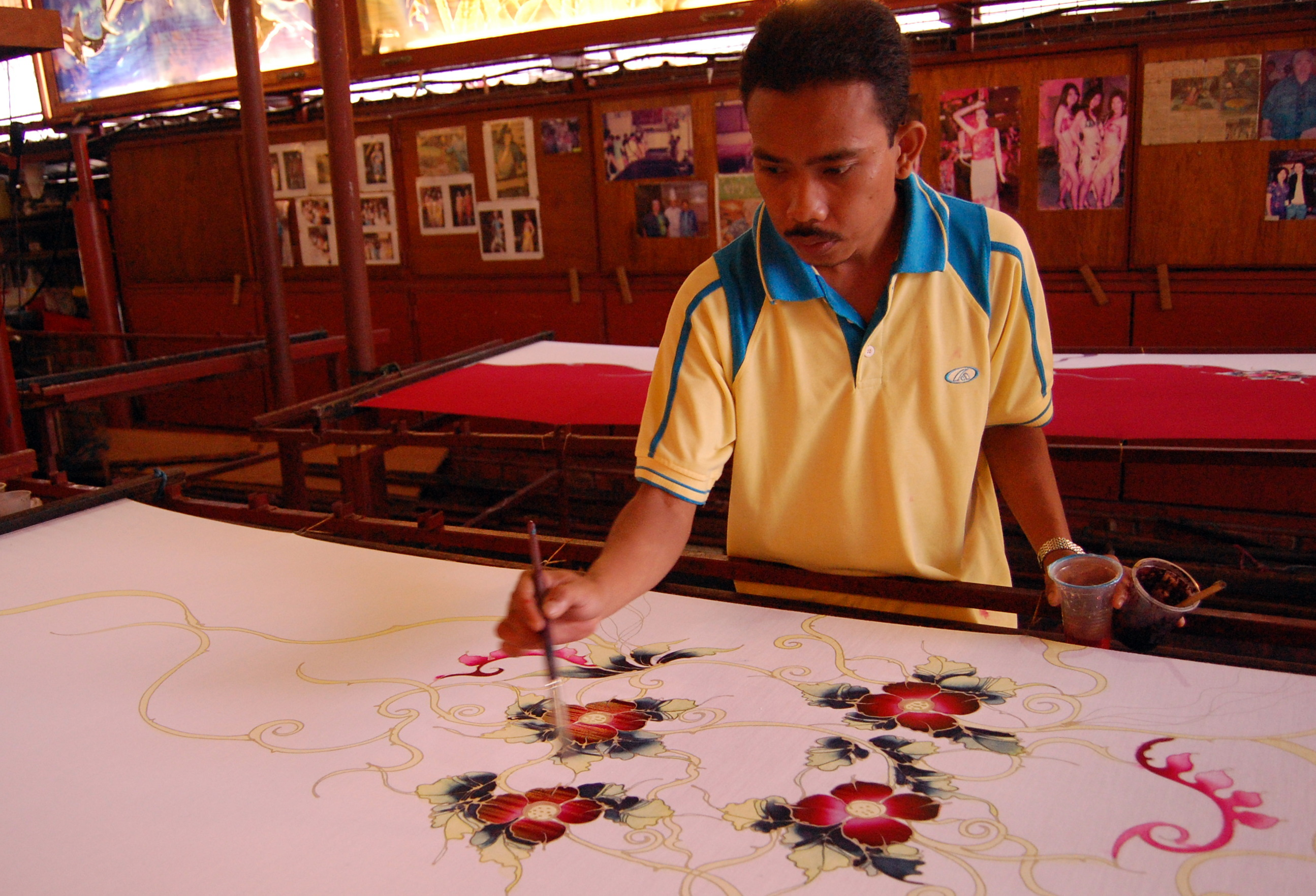
A craftsman making batik. Malaysian batik is usually patterned with floral motifs with light colouring.

Traditional Malaysian art is mainly centred on the crafts of carving, weaving, and silversmithing. Traditional art ranges from handwoven baskets from rural areas to the silverwork of the Malay courts. Common artworks included ornamental kris and beetle nut sets. Luxurious textiles known as Songket are made, as well as traditional patterned batik fabrics. Indigenous East Malaysians are known for their wooden masks. Malaysian art has expanded only recently, as before the 1950s Islamic taboos about drawing people and animals were strong. Textiles such as the batik, songket, Pua Kumbu, and tekat are used for decorations, often embroidered with a painting or pattern. Traditional jewelry was made from gold and silver adorned with gems, and, in East Malaysia, leather and beads were used to the same effect.

Earthenware has been developed in many areas. The Labu Sayong is a gourd-shaped clay jar that holds water. Perak is famous for these. Also used to store water is the angular Terenang. The belanga is a clay bowl used to cook, with a wide base that allows heat to spread easily. Carved wood is used as ornamentation for many items, such as doors and window panels. Woodcarving was never an industry, but an art. Traditional woodcarvers spent years simply preparing the wood, due to a belief that woodcarvers need to be a perfect match with their wood. The wood also had to match the buyer, so woodcarving was a very ritualised task.

Each ethnic group has distinct performing arts, with little overlap between them. Malay art shows some North Indian influence. A form of art called mak yong, incorporating dance and drama, remains strong in the Kelantan state. However, older Malayan-Thai performing arts such as mak yong have declined in popularity throughout the country due to their Hindu-Buddhist origin. Since the Islamisation period, the arts and tourism ministry have focused on newer dances of Portuguese, Middle Eastern, or Mughal origin. Malay traditional dances include joget melayu and zapin. In recent years, dikir barat has grown in popularity, and it is actively promoted by state governments as a cultural icon. Silat is another popular Malay martial art and dance form, believed to increase a person's spiritual strength. Wayang kulit (shadow puppet theatre) has been popular in Malaysia for centuries. The puppets are usually made with cow and buffalo skin, and are carved and painted by hand. Plays done with shadow puppets are often based on traditional stories, especially tales from the Ramayana and the Mahabharata. Traditionally, theatrical music is performed only by men. Javanese immigrants brought Kuda Kepang to Johor, and is a form of dance where dancers sit on mock horses and tells the tales of Islamic wars. The Chinese communities brought traditional lion dances and dragon dances with them, while Indians brought art forms such as Bharata Natyam and Bhangra. Colonialism also brought other art forms, such as the Portuguese Farapeira and Branyo. There are a variety of traditional dances, which often have very strong spiritual significance. Different tribes from west and east Malaysia have different dances.

== Architecture ==
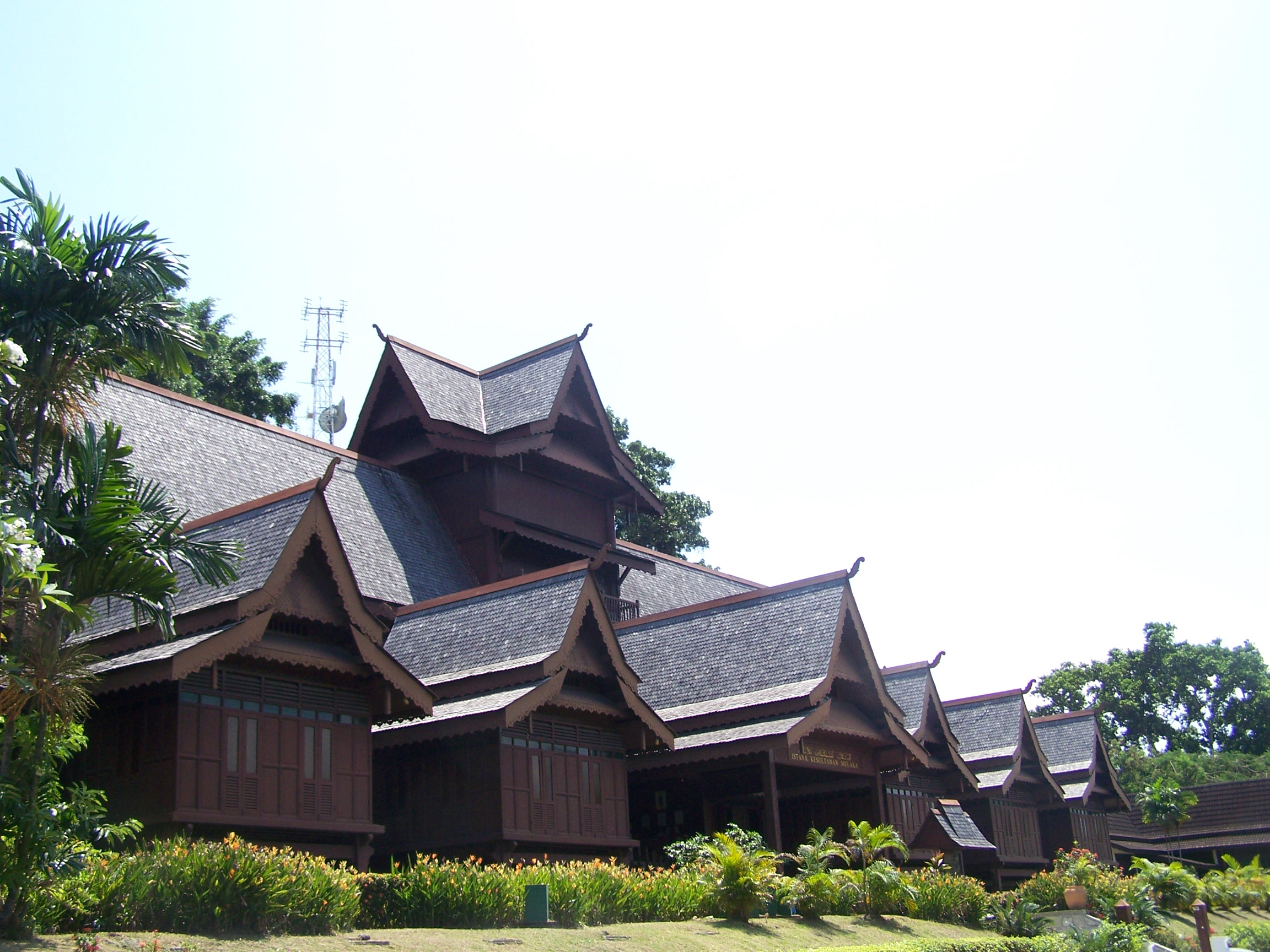
Replica of the palace of the Malacca Sultanate, built from information in the Malay Annals.

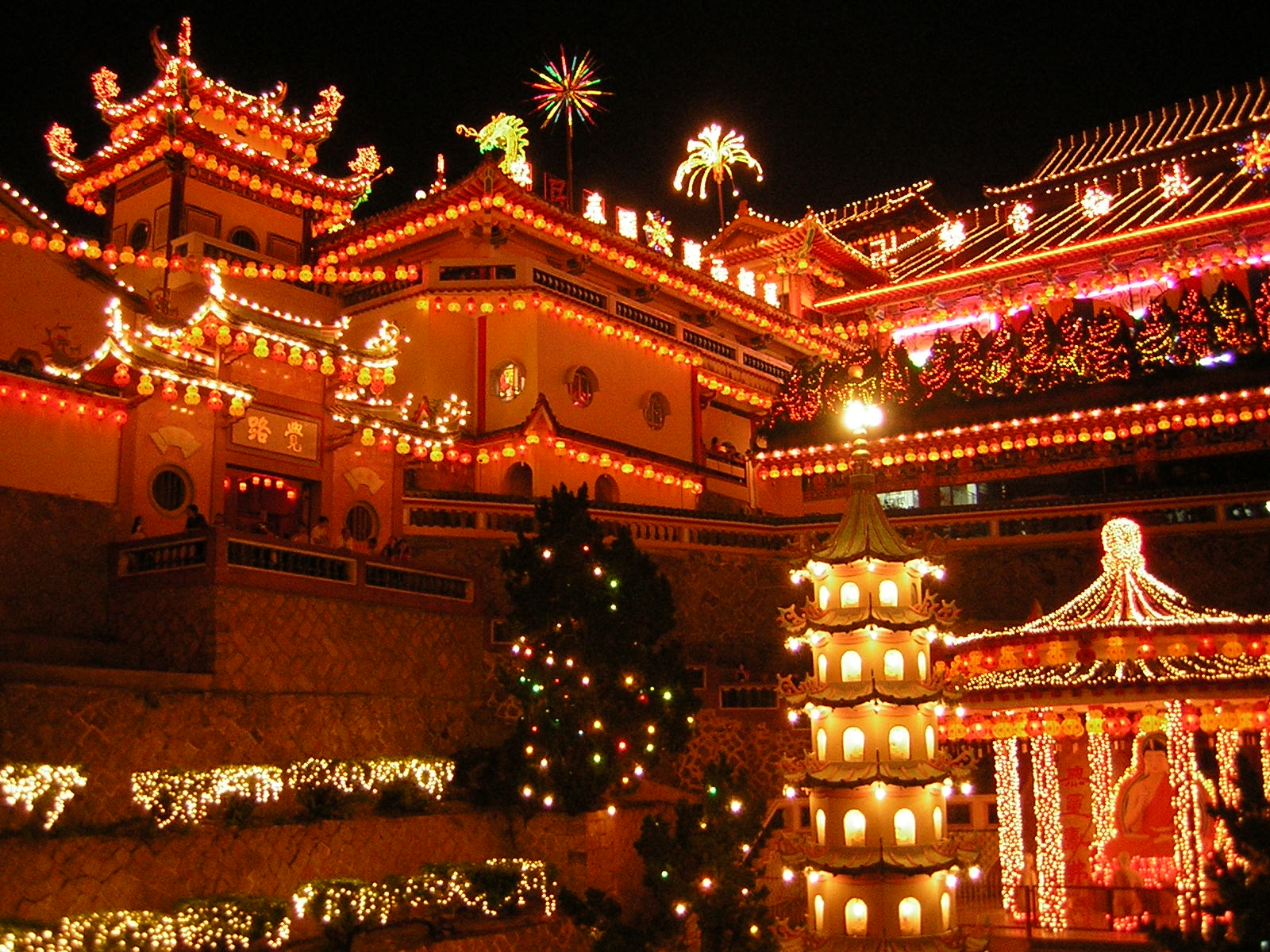
South-East Asia's Largest Temple- Kek Lok Si in Penang being illuminated in preparation for the Lunar New Year.

Architecture in Malaysia is a combination of many styles, from Islamic and Chinese styles to those brought by European colonists. Malay architecture has changed due to these influences. Houses in the north are similar to those in Thailand, while those in the south are similar to those in Java. New materials, such as glasses and nails, were brought in by Europeans, changing the architecture. Houses are built for tropical conditions, raised on stilts with high roofs and large windows, allowing air to flow through the house and cool it down. Wood has been the main building material for much of Malaysia's history; it is used for everything from the simple kampung to royal palaces. In Negeri Sembilan traditional houses are entirely free of nails. Besides wood, other common materials such as bamboo and leaves were used. The Istana Kenangan in Kuala Kangsar was built in 1926, and it the only Malay palace with bamboo walls. The Oral Asal of East Malaysia live in longhouses and water villages. Longhouses are elevated and on stilts, and can house 20 to 100 families. Water villages are also built on stilts, with houses connected with planks and most transport by boats.

== Music ==
Traditional Malay music and performing arts appear to have originated in the Kelantan-Pattani region. The music is based around percussion instruments, the most important of which is the gendang (drum). There are at least 14 types of traditional drums. Drums and other traditional percussion instruments are often made from natural materials such as shells. Other instruments include the rebab (a bowed string instrument), the serunai (a double-reed oboe-like instrument), the seruling (flute), and trumpets. Music is traditionally used for storytelling, celebrating life-cycle events, and at annual events such as the harvest. Music was once used as a form of long-distance communication. Traditional orchestra can be divided between two forms, the gamelan which plays melodies using gongs and string instruments, and the nobat which uses wind instruments to create more solemn music.

In East Malaysia, ensembles based around gongs such as agung and kulintang are commonly used in ceremonies such as funerals and weddings. These ensembles are also common in the southern Philippines, Kalimantan in Indonesia, and in Brunei. Chinese and Indian Malaysians have their own forms of music, and the indigenous tribes of Peninsula and East Malaysia have unique traditional instruments. In countries such as Singapore, Malaysia and Indonesia it is believed that performing at the house during Hari Raya (a traditional malay festival) is a good belief as it brings goodluck and fortune to the performers and host of the house.

Within Malaysia, the largest performing arts venue is the Petronas Philharmonic Hall. The resident orchestra is the Malaysian Philharmonic Orchestra. Malay popular music is a combination of styles from all ethnicities in the country. The Malaysian government has taken steps to control what music is available in Malaysia; rap music has been criticised, heavy metal has been limited, and foreign bands must submit a recording of a recent concert before playing in Malaysia. It is believed that this music is a bad influence on youth.

== Literature ==
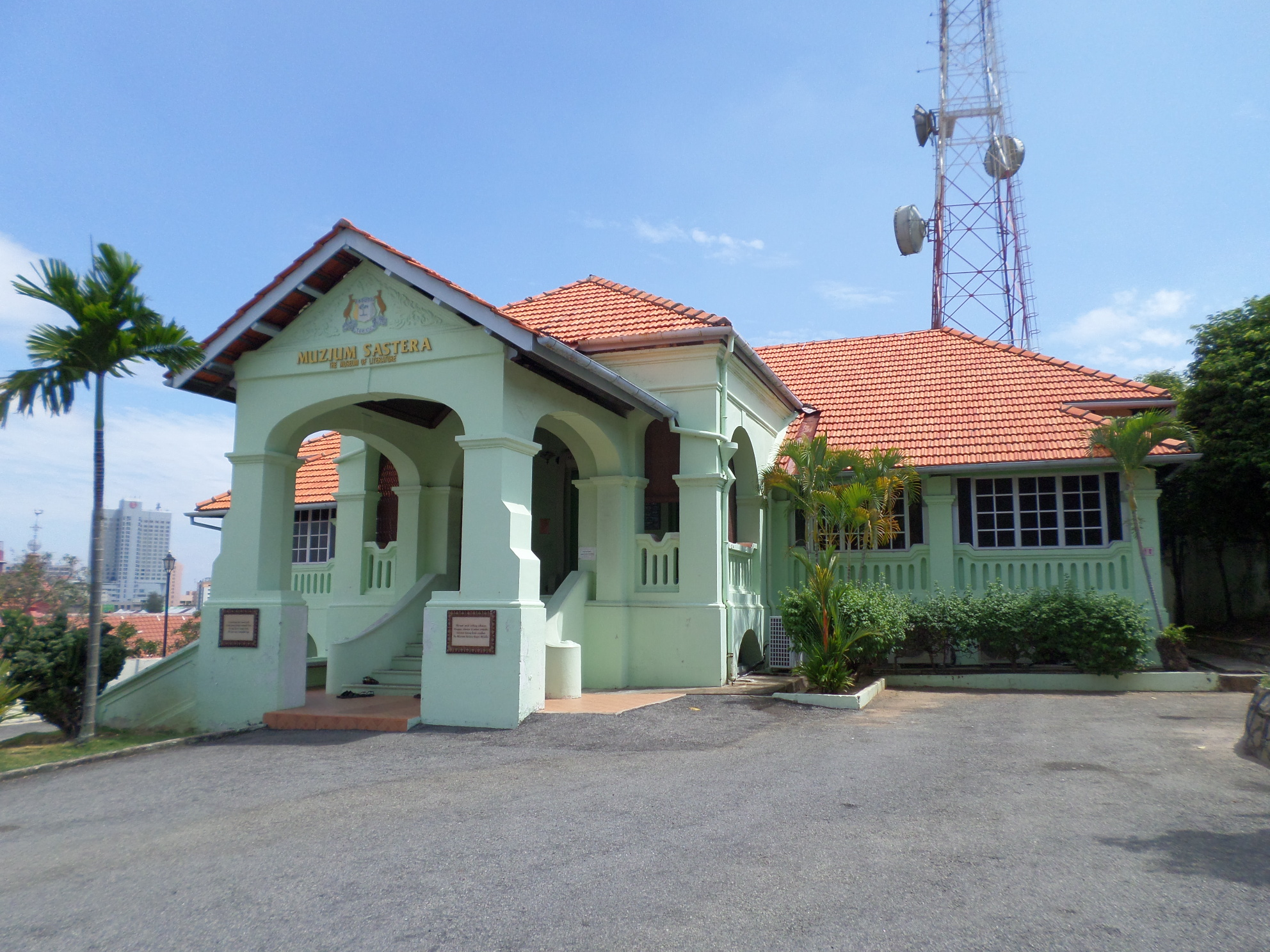
Malacca Literature Museum

The strong oral tradition that has existed since before the arrival of writing to what is now Malaysia continues today. These early works were heavily influenced by Indian epics. Oral literature such as folktales flourished even after printed works appeared. The Arabic Jawi script arrived with the coming of Islam to the peninsula in the late 15th century. At this point, stories which previously had given lessons in Hinduism and Buddhism were taken to have more universal meanings, with their main story lines remaining intact. Each of the Malay Sultanates created their own literary tradition influenced by preexisting oral stories and by the stories that came with Islam. The arrival of the printing press in Malaysia was key in allowing literature to be accessed by more than those rich enough to afford handwritten manuscripts. There was a division between the royal Malays, who knew English, and the lower classes, who only read Malay. In the early years of the 20th century, literature began to change to reflect the changing norms of Malaysians. In 1971 the government took the step of defining the literature of different languages. Literature written in Malay was called "The National Literature of Malaysia"; literature in other bumiputra languages was called "regional literature"; literature in other languages was called "sectional literature".

Malay poetry is highly developed, and uses many forms. A Hikayat is a traditional narrative, and stories written in that fashion are named using Hikayat followed by the name(s) of the protagonist(s). The pantun is a form of poetry used in many aspects of Malay culture. The Syair is another form of narrative, once very popular. The Hikayat form remains popular, and the pantun has spread from Malay to other languages. Until the 19th century, literature produced in Malaysia focused mainly on tales of royalty, as it was produced just for royalty. It was after this point that it expanded to other areas. The race riots of 1969 strongly influenced literature; the improvements of the economy in the 1980s brought about social changes and new forms of literature.

The first Malay literature was in Arabic script. The earliest known Malay writing is on the Terengganu Inscription Stone, made in 1303. One of the more famous Malay works is the Sulalatus al-Salatin, also known as the Sejarah Melayu (meaning "The Malay Annals"). It was originally recorded in the 15th century, although it has since been edited; the known version is from the 16th century. The Hikaya Rajit Pasai, written in the 15th century, is another significant literary work. The Hikayat Hang Tuah, or story of Hang Tuah, tells the story of Hang Tuah and his devotion to his Sultan. This is the most famous Hikayat; it drew from the Sejarah Melayu. Both have been nominated as world heritage items under the United Nations Educational, Scientific and Cultural Organization (UNESCO) 'Memory of the World' programme. Folktales such as the Hikayat Sang Kancil, about a clever mouse deer, are popular, as are adventures such as Ramayana, adapted from Indian epics. Munshi Abdullah (Abdullah bin Abdul Kadir), who lived from 1797 to 1854, is regarded as the father of Malay literature. Hikayat Abdullah, his autobiography, is about everyday life at the time when British influence was spreading. Female Malay writers began becoming popular in the 1950s.

Different ethnic and linguistic groups have produced works in their own languages. Chinese and Indian literature became common as the numbers of speakers increased in Malaysia, and locally produced works based in languages from those areas began to be produced in the 19th century. Beginning in the 1950s, Chinese literature expanded; homemade literature in Indian languages has failed to emerge. English has become a common literary language.

== Cuisine ==
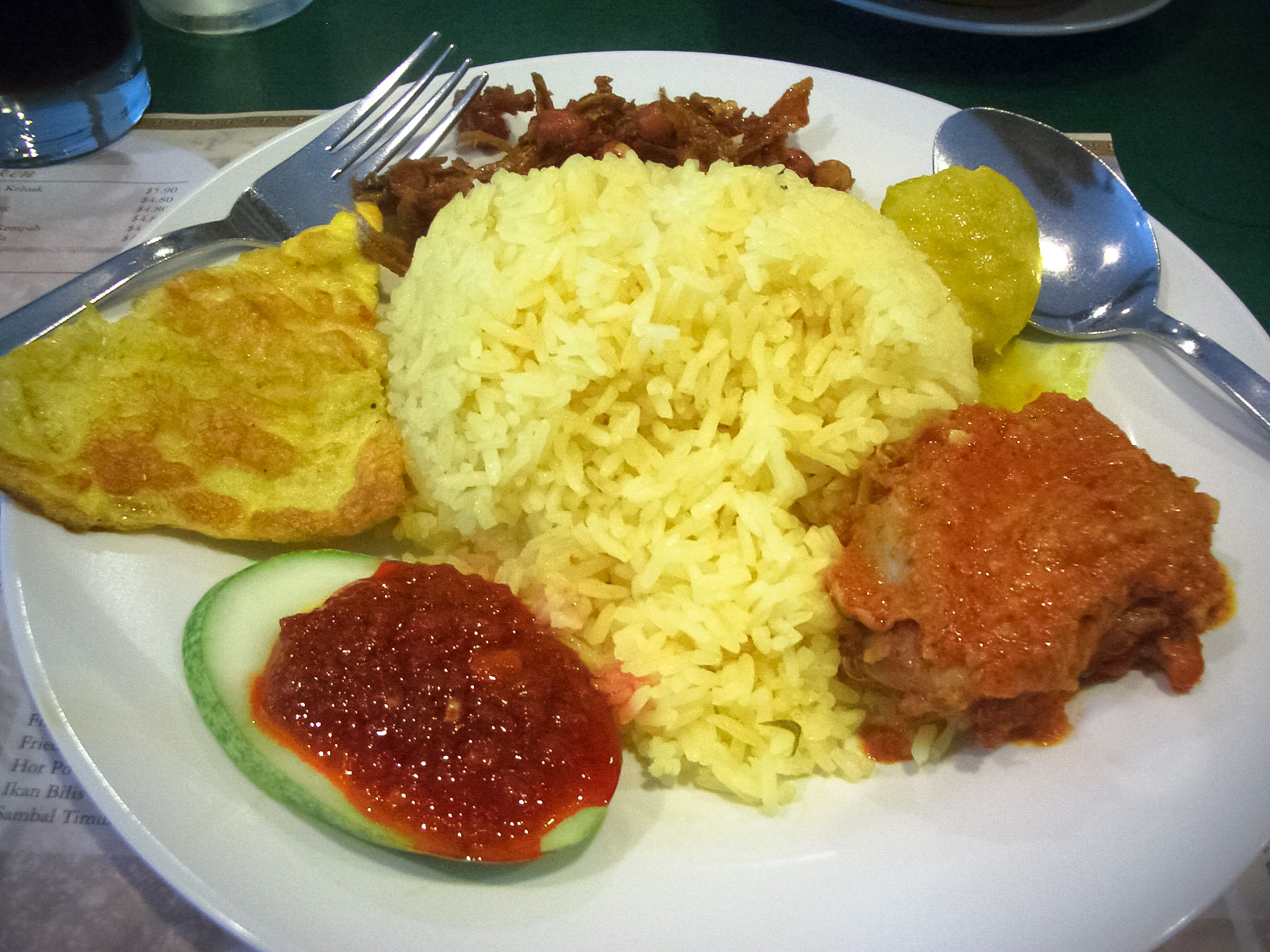
Nasi Lemak, the national dish of Malaysia

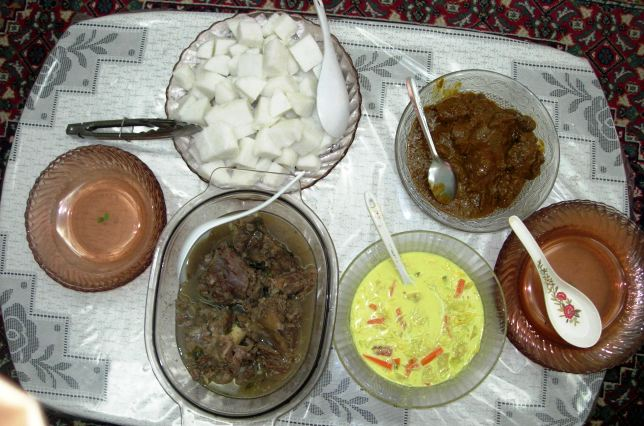
Clockwise from bottom left: beef soup, ketupat (compressed rice cubes), beef rendang and sayur lodeh

Malaysia's cuisine reflects the multiethnic makeup of its population, and is defined by its diversity. Many cultures from Malaysia and the surrounding areas have greatly influenced Malaysian cuisine, with strong influence from Malay, Chinese, Indian, Thai, Javanese, and Sumatran cuisines. Much of this is due to Malaysia being a part of the ancient spice route. The cuisine is very similar to that of Singapore and Brunei, and also bears resemblance to Filipino cuisine. The different states of Malaysia have varied dishes, and often the food in Malaysia is different from the original dishes.

Sometimes food not found in its original culture is assimilated into another; for example, Chinese restaurants in Malaysia often serve Malaysian dishes. Food from one culture is sometimes cooked using styles taken from another. This means that although many Malaysian dishes originate from another culture, they have their own identities. Often the food in Malaysia is different from the original dishes; for example, Chinese food is often sweeter in Malaysian versions than the original. The Peranakans, Chinese who moved to Malaysia centuries ago, have their own unique cuisine that Chinese cooking techniques with Malay ingredients.

During a dinner food is not served in courses, but all at once. Rice is popular in many Malaysian dishes. Chilli is commonly found in Malaysian dishes, although this does not make them spicy. Noodles are common. Pork is rarely used in Malaysia, because of the large Muslim population. Some celebrations have food associated with them, and mooncakes are often eaten during Mooncake Festival.

== Clothing ==
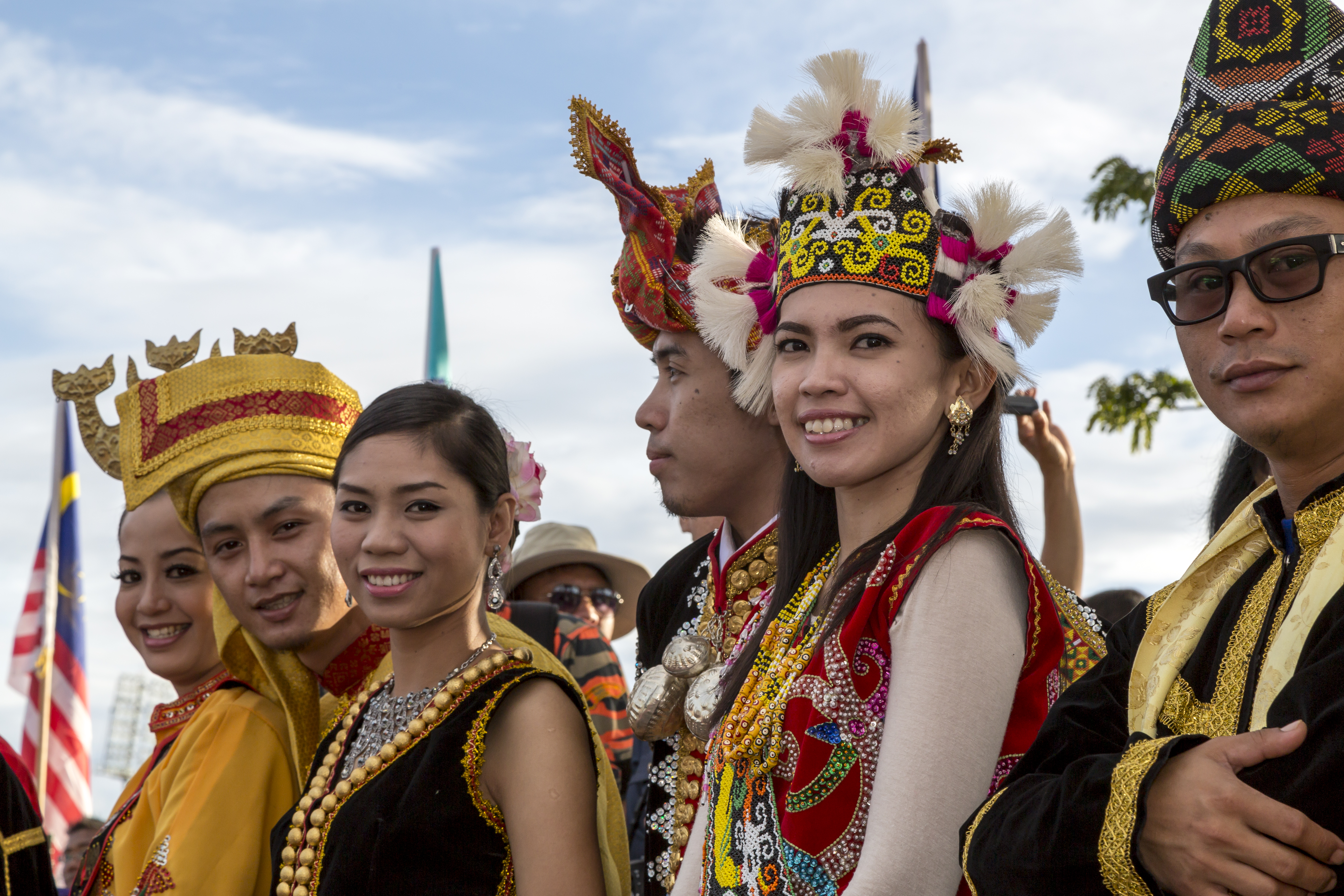
Some of the traditional clothes from East Malaysia

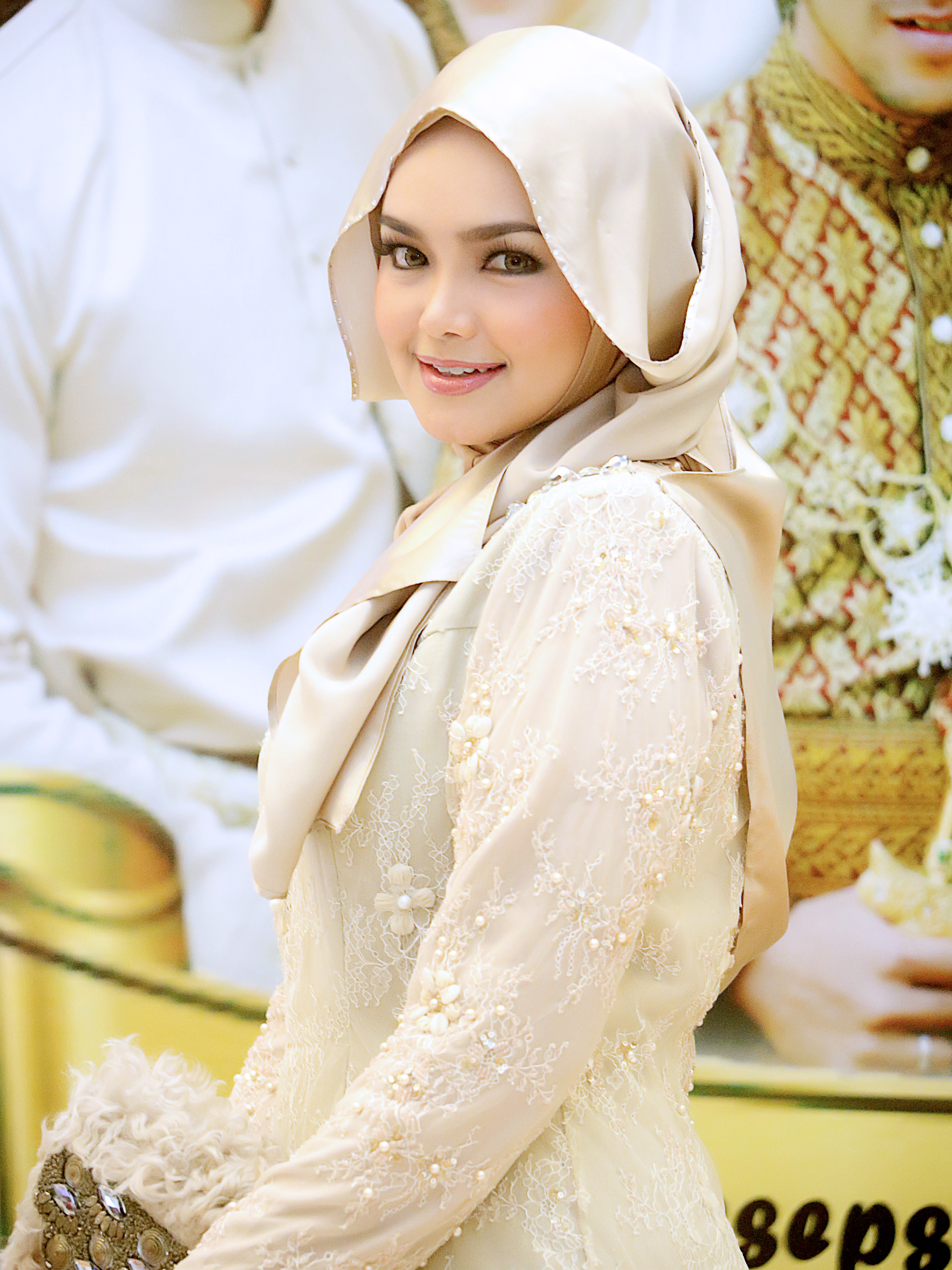
Siti Nurhaliza wearing a tudung

As of 2013 most Muslim Malaysian women wear the tudung, a type of hijab. This use of the tudung was uncommon prior to the 1979 Iranian revolution, and the places that had women in tudung tended to be rural areas. The usage of the tudung sharply increased after the 1970s. as religious conservatism among Malay people in both Malaysia and Singapore increased.

Several members of the Kelantan ulama in the 1960s believed the hijab was not mandatory. By 2015 the Malaysian ulama believed this previous viewpoint was un-Islamic.

By 2015 Malaysia had a fashion industry related to the tudung. By 2015 Muslim Malay society had a negative reaction to Muslim women who do not wear tudung.

Norhayati Kaprawi directed a 2011 documentary about the use of tudung in Malaysia, "Siapa Aku?" ("Who am I?"). It is in Malay, with English subtitles available.

== Holidays ==
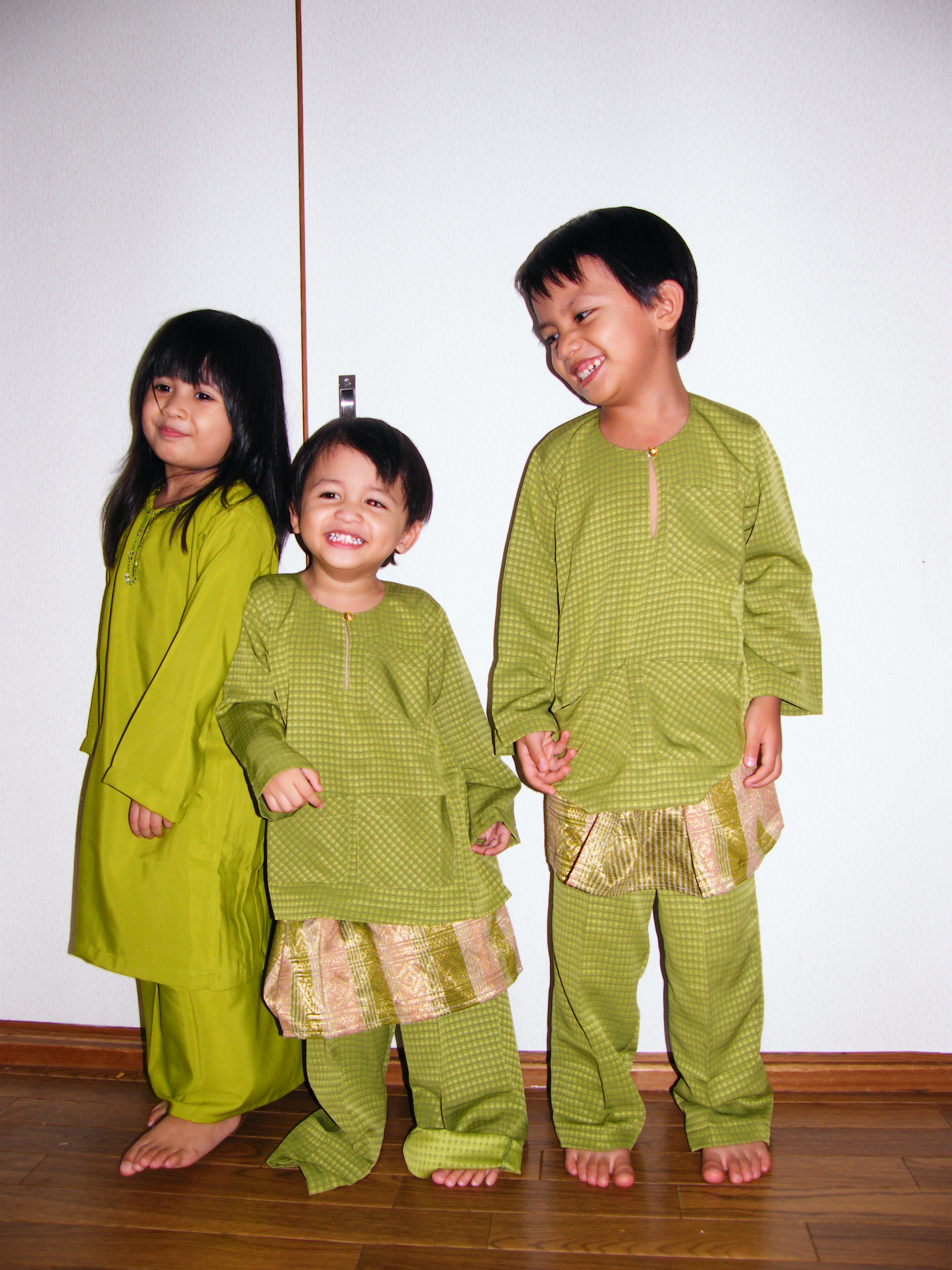
Malay children dressed for Hari raya

Malaysians observe a number of holidays and festivities throughout the year, on both the federal and state level. Other festivals are observed by particular ethnic or religion groups, but are not public holidays. The main holy days of each major religion are public holidays. The most widespread holiday is the "Hari Merdeka" (Independence Day), otherwise known as "Merdeka" (Freedom), on 31 August. It commemorates the independence of the Federation of Malaya. This, as well as Labour Day (1 May), the King's birthday (first Saturday of June), and some other festivals are major national public holidays. Federal Territory day is celebrated in the three Federal territories (on 1 February). Malaysia Day, held on 16 September, commemorates the formation of Malaysia through the union of Malaya, Singapore, Sabah, and Sarawak, although it is celebrated mainly in East Malaysia.

New Year's Day, Chinese New Year, and the start of the Islamic calendar are all public holidays. Muslim holidays are highly prominent in Malaysia. The most important of these is Hari Raya Puasa (also called Hari Raya Aidilfitri), which is the Malay translation of Eid al-Fitr. It is a festival honoured by Muslims worldwide marking the end of Ramadan, the fasting month. They also celebrate Hari Raya Haji (also called Hari Raya Aidiladha, the translation of Eid ul-Adha), Awal Muharram (Islamic New Year) and Maulidur Rasul (Birthday of the Prophet).

Malaysian Chinese typically hold the same festivals observed by Chinese around the world. Chinese New Year is the most prominent, lasting for 15 days. Hindus in Malaysia celebrate Deepavali, the festival of light, while Thaipusam is a celebration in which pilgrims from all over the country meet at the Batu Caves. Wesak (Malay for Vesak), the day of Buddha's birth, is a public holiday. Malaysia's Christian community observes most of the holidays observed by Christians elsewhere, most notably Christmas and Easter. Good Friday, however, is only a public holiday in the two Bornean states. The harvest festivals of Gawai in Sarawak and Kaamatan in Sabah are also important for East Malaysians.

Despite most of the festivals being identified with a particular ethnic or religious group, festivities are often participated in by all Malaysians. One example of this is the celebration of Kongsi Raya, which is celebrated when Hari Raya Puasa and Chinese New Year coincide. The term Kongsi Raya (which means "sharing the celebration" in Malay) was coined because of the similarity between the word kongsi and the Chinese New Year greeting of Gong xi fa cai. Similarly, the portmanteau Deepa Raya was coined when Hari Raya Puasa and Deepavali coincided.

A practice known as "open house" (rumah terbuka) is common during the festivities, especially during Hari Raya Aidilfitri, Deepavali, Chinese New Year, and Christmas. Open house means that all well-wishers are received and that everyone, regardless of background, is invited to attend. Open houses are normally held at the home of the host and foods are prepared by the host. There are also open houses held at larger public venues, especially when hosted by government agencies or corporations. Most Malaysians take the time off work or school to return to their hometowns to celebrate the festivities with their extended relatives. This practice is commonly known as balik kampung and usually causes traffic jams on most highways in the country.

== Sports ==
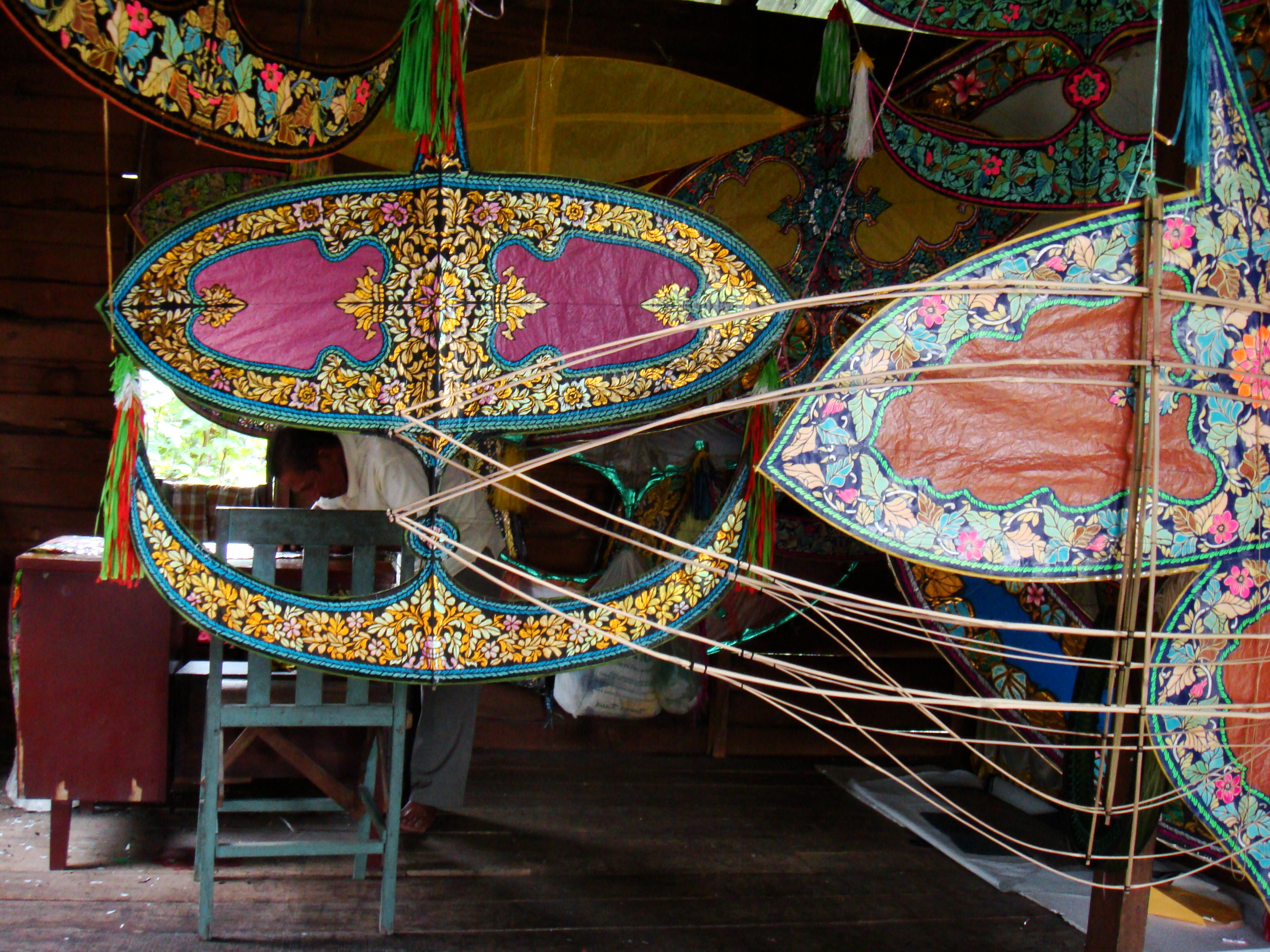
A wau workshop

Popular sports in Malaysia include badminton, bowling, football, squash, and field hockey. Malaysia has small-scale traditional sports. Wau is a traditional form of kite-flying involving kites created with intricate designs. These kites can reach heights of nearly 500 metres (1,640 ft), and due to bamboo attachments create a humming sound when flown. Sepak takraw is a game in which a rattan ball is kept in the air without using hands. A traditional game played during the rice harvest season was throwing gasing, which are large tops weighing around 5 kilograms (11 lb), which are thrown by unfurling a rope and scooped off the ground while spinning. They are known to be able to spin for over an hour. Other sports are dragon dancing and dragon-boat racing. Malaysia's coastline is popular for scuba diving, sailing, and other water sports and activities. Whitewater rafting and trekking are also often done.

Many international sports are highly popular in Malaysia. Badminton matches in Malaysia attract thousands of spectators, and Malaysia, along with Indonesia and China, has consistently held the Thomas Cup since 1949. Famous players include Lee Chong Wei. The Malaysian Lawn Bowls Federation (PLBM) was registered in 1997, and already fields a strong international team and has made progress on the international stage. Squash was brought to Malaysia by members of the British army, with the first competition being held in 1939. The Squash Racquets Association of Malaysia (SRAM) was created on 25 June 1972, and has had great success in Asian squash competitions. Football is popular in Malaysia, and Malaysia has proposed a Southeast Asian football league. Hockey is popular in Malaysia, with the Malaysian team ranked 14th in the world as of 2010. Malaysia hosted the third Hockey World Cup at the Merdeka Stadium in Kuala Lumpur, before also hosting the 10th cup. Malaysia has its own Formula One track, the Sepang International Circuit. It runs for 310.408 kilometres (193 mi), and held its first Grand Prix in 2000. Golf is growing in popularity, with many courses being built around the country.

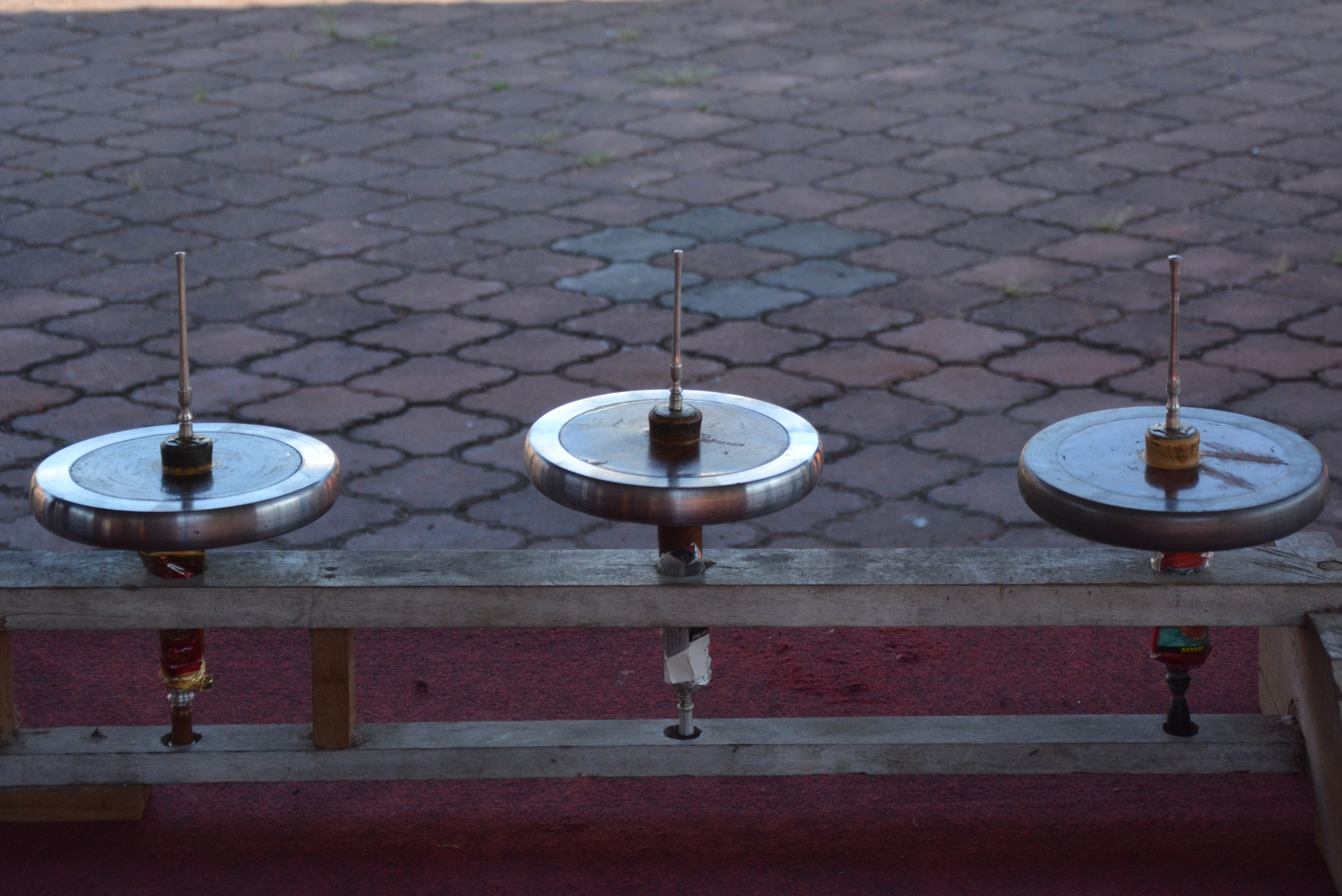
Gasing spinning top at the cultural center Gelanggang Seni

The Federation of Malaya Olympic Council was formed in 1953, and received recognition by the International Olympic Committee in 1954. It first participated in the 1956 Melbourne Olympic Games. The council was renamed the Olympic Council of Malaysia in 1964, and has participated in all but one Olympic games since the council was formed. The largest number of athletes sent to the Olympics was 57, to the 1972 Munich Olympic Games. Malaysian athletes have won a total of four Olympic medals, all of which are in badminton. Malaysia has competed at the Commonwealth Games since 1950 as Malaya, and 1966 as Malaysia. It has been dominant in badminton, and hosted the games in Kuala Lumpur in 1998. The 1998 Commonwealth Games were the first time the torch relay went through more nations than just England and the host country.

Besides Malay newspapers, there is large circulation of English, Chinese, and Tamil dailies. The media has been blamed for increasing tension between Indonesia and Malaysia, and giving Malaysians a bad image of Indonesians. There is a divide between the media in the two halves of Malaysia. Peninsular-based media gives low priority to news from East Malaysia, and often treats it as a colony of the Peninsular. Internet access is rare outside the main urban centres, and those of the lower classes have less access to non-government news sources.

The regulated freedom of the press has been criticised, and it has been claimed that the government threatens journalists with reduced employment opportunities and denial of family admittance to universities. The Malaysian government has previously tried to crack down on opposition papers before elections when the ruling party was unsure of its political situation. In 2007, a government agency issued a directive to all private television and radio stations to refrain from broadcasting speeches made by opposition leaders, a move condemned by politicians from the opposition Democratic Action Party. Sabah, where only one tabloid is not independent of government control, has the freest press in Malaysia. Legislation such as the Printing Presses and Publications Act has been cited as curtailing freedom of expression. The Malaysian government has large control over the media due to this Act, which stipulates that a media organisation must have the government's permission to operate. However, the "Bill of Guarantee of No Internet Censorship" passed in the 1990s means that internet news is uncensored.

=== Cinema ===
Malaysian filming has gone through five stages. The first stage occurred when narrative filmmaking began in 1933, with the production of Laila Majnun by a company operating out of Singapore. For the first couple of decades following World War II, most films were directed by directors from India and the Philippines, which produced a second stage of movies. The first locally directed film, Permata di-Perlembahan, was produced in 1952. It however failed in the cinemas. A third stage appeared as Singapore-based studios began to produce films in the 1950s, but the industry was subsequently damaged due to independence of Singapore and the loss of studios there. Indonesian films gained popularity at this time, although a small group of filmmakers continued to produce in Malaysia, forming the fourth stage. In the 1980s the local industry began to recover, bringing about the fifth and most eloquent stage, which covered more themes than any previous stage. This was also the first time non-Malay films began to have a significant presence.

The government began to sponsor films in 1975, creating the National Film Development Corporation in 1981. Through this the government offers loans to filmmaker's who want to develop films, however the criteria for obtaining funds has been criticised as promoting only commercial films. Due to this lack of government funding for smaller projects, a strong independent film movement has developed. There has been a large increase in short films, which in the past two decades have begun to gain status in international film festivals. Independent documentaries often cover areas which would normally be censored by the government, such as sex and sexuality, as well as racial inequality and tension. Although the government has criticised some films for not showing multiculturalism, its actions have been inconsistent in that respect, and often favour the Malay culture over others.

== See also ==
- Arabization in Malaysia
- Malaysian cultural outfits
- Television in Malaysia
- List of libraries in Malaysia
- List of museums in Malaysia
