= Indonesia–Malaysia relations =

- Indonesia: Malaysia

Diplomatic mission
- Indonesian Embassy, Kuala Lumpur: Malaysian Embassy, Jakarta

Envoy
- Ambassador Hermono: Ambassador Syed Mohamad Hasrin

Indonesia and Malaysia established diplomatic relations on 31 August 1957. It is one of the most important bilateral relationships in Southeast Asia.

Indonesia and Malaysia are two neighbouring nations that share similarities in many aspects. Both Malaysia and Indonesia have many common characteristic traits, including standard frames of reference in history, culture and religion. Although both countries are separate and independent states, there are also profoundly embedded similarities. The national languages Indonesian and Malaysian Malay are closely related and largely mutually intelligible. Both nations are Muslim-majority countries, founding members of ASEAN and APEC, and also members of the Non-Aligned Movement, Developing 8 Countries, United Nations, and Organisation of Islamic Cooperation.

Although both nations are tied by a common religion, language, proximity and cultural heritage that dates back centuries, the relationship has been known to be unfriendly, as they often engage in diplomatic spats. Since their independences, Indonesia and Malaysia have moved in different directions in their respective social, economic, and political developments, which has contributed to tension. The unequal pace of democratisation in the two countries over the last decades has made the relationship increasingly problematic. Malaysian government-controlled media has been restrained in reporting sensitive issues involving Indonesia. On the other hand, Indonesia's liberal mass media has played a key role in inflaming the tension.

== History ==
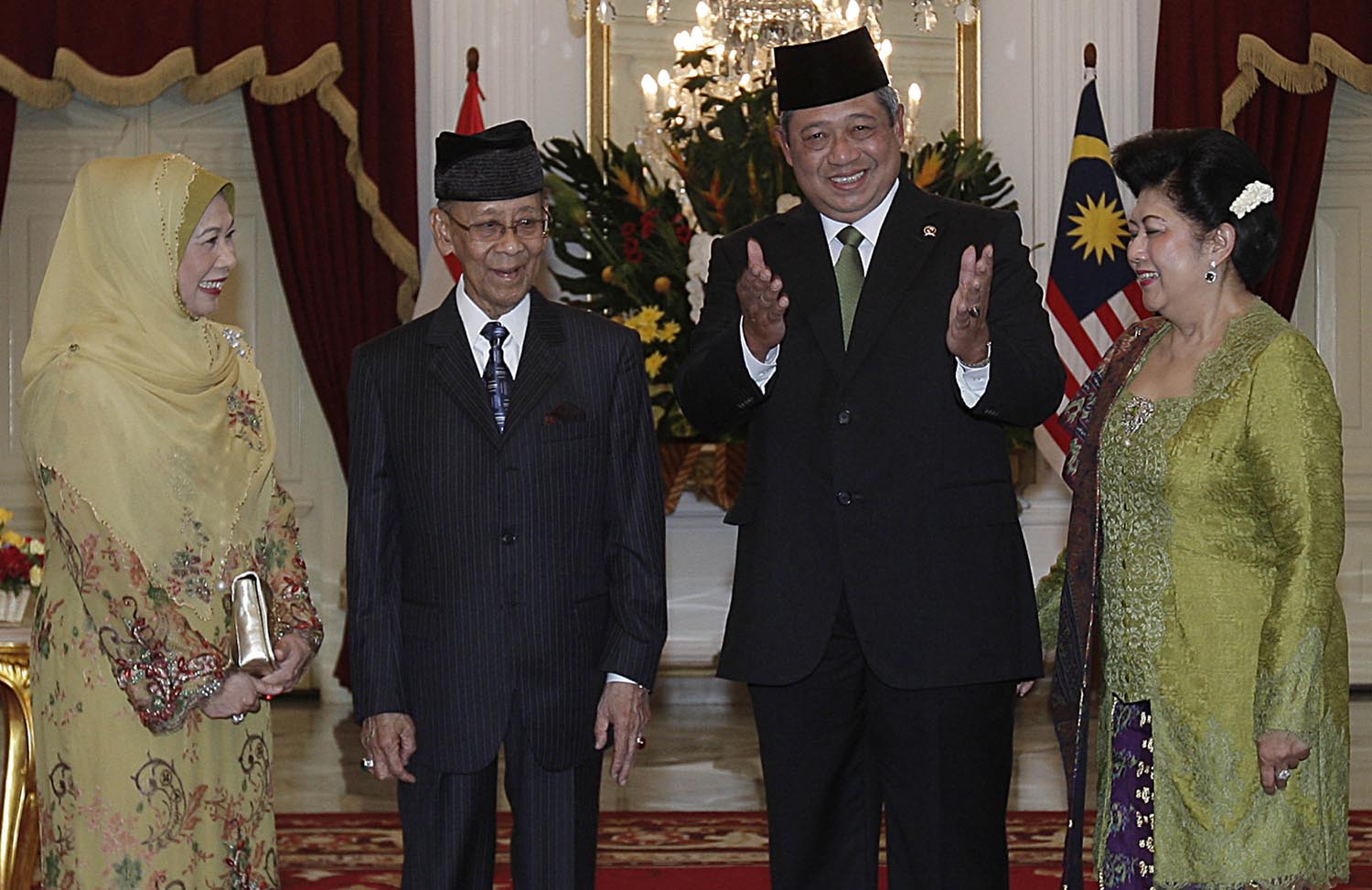
President Susilo Bambang Yudhoyono and Yang di-Pertuan Agong Tuanku Abdul Halim with their wives in Istana Merdeka, Jakarta.

The history of Indonesia and history of Malaysia were often intertwined. Throughout their history, the borders of ancient kingdoms and empires – such as Srivijaya, Majapahit, Malacca, Johor-Riau and Brunei – often comprised both modern-day countries. For centuries, the relations, migrations, and interactions between Indonesian and Malaysian people have been quite intense, and it is common for Malaysians to trace their relatives in Indonesia and vice versa. The Malays' homes are on both sides of the strait and also on coastal Borneo, while Dayak homelands are both in East Malaysian Borneo and Indonesian Kalimantan. Some of the Indonesian origin ethnic groups such as Acehnese, Minangkabau, Javanese, Banjarese and Bugis had significant migration to Malaysia and formed significant communities in Malaysia. Negeri Sembilan, in particular, has large numbers of Minangkabau people, Acehnese in Kedah, Javanese in Johor, Banjarese in Perak and Bugis in Selangor and Sabah. Meanwhile in some parts of Indonesia especially in North Sumatra, Aceh, Riau, Riau Islands, West Kalimantan and North Kalimantan have significant populations that have ancestry or origins in the Sultanates and Kingdoms of the Malay Peninsula and North Borneo.

During the colonial era, the region was contested among European colonial powers, notably British and Dutch. From the 17th to early 19th century, various states, ports, and cities in the region were held as Dutch colonies or British possessions. The current borders between Indonesia and Malaysia were inherited from those established by the colonial powers through their treaties. The Anglo-Dutch Treaty of 1814 and 1824 significantly shaped the territories of Indonesia, Malaysia and Singapore. These treaties officially divided the archipelago into two: British Malaya, which was ruled by the United Kingdom, and the Dutch East Indies, which was ruled by the Netherlands. The successor states of British Malaya and the Dutch East Indies are Malaysia, Singapore, and Brunei on the one hand, and Indonesia, on the other. The line that separated the spheres of influence between the British and the Dutch ultimately became the border between Indonesia and Malaysia.

During World War II both British Malaya and Borneo together with the Dutch East Indies fell to the Japanese Empire. After the Japanese defeat, Indonesia declared its independence in 1945, followed a war of independence against the Dutch until 1949. The British re-established their authority in Malaya, and their withdrawal two decades later meant the independence of the states of Malaysia, Singapore, and Brunei. The diplomatic relations between the Republic of Indonesia and the Federation of Malaya were established promptly after Malaya's independence from Britain in 1957.

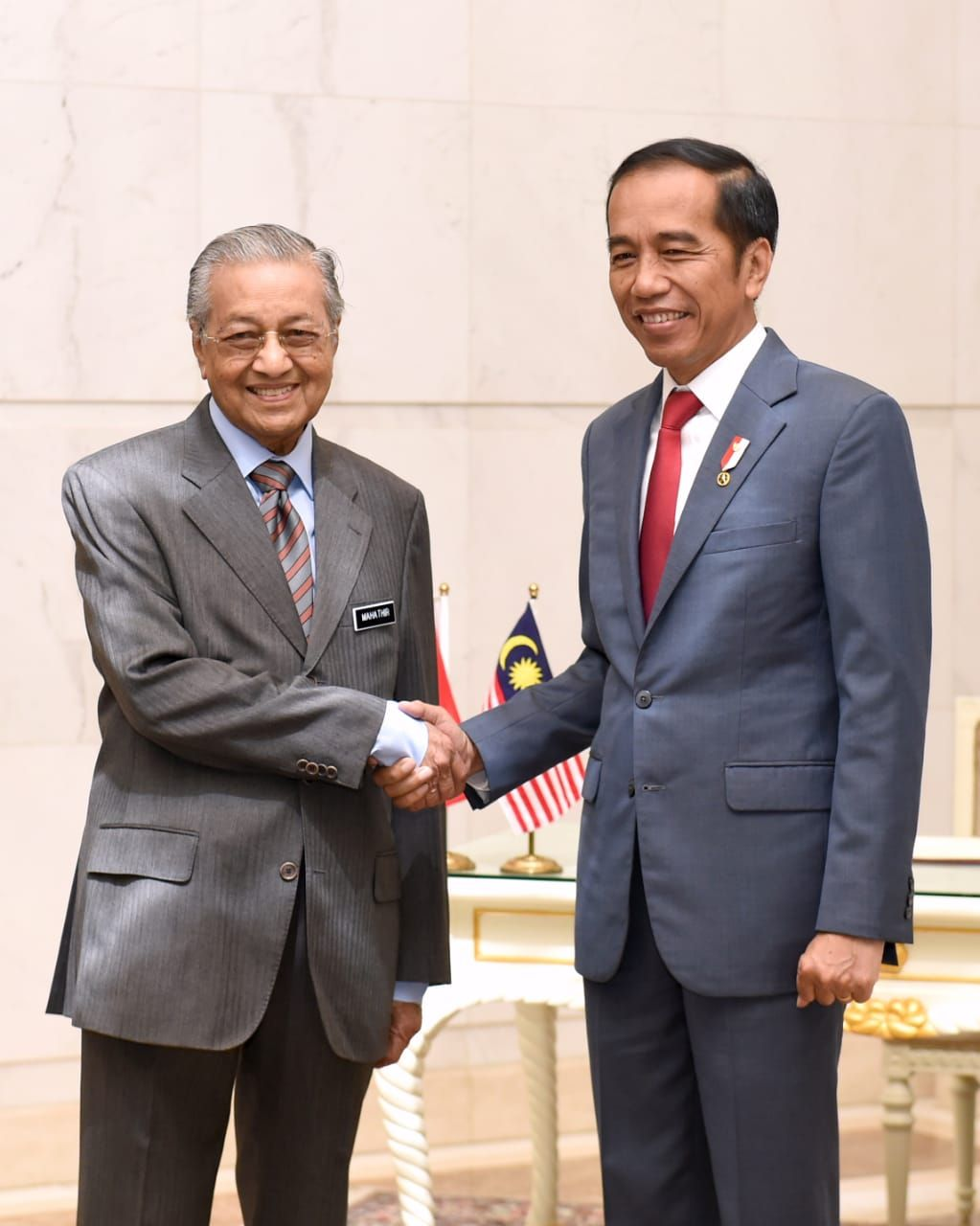
President of Indonesia Joko Widodo and Prime Minister of Malaysia Mahathir Mohamad in Putrajaya, 9 August 2019

However, the relations between the two nations deteriorated under Indonesian President Sukarno in 1962 (see Indonesia–Malaysia confrontation, and Indonesian withdrawal from the United Nations). The conflict resulted from Indonesian opposition to the formation of Malaysia, a merger of the Federation of Malaya with two former British colonies on Borneo: Sarawak and North Borneo. The conflict has led to the termination of diplomatic relations on 17 September 1963.

After the fall of Sukarno, relations between Indonesia and Malaysia were restored under President Suharto; as both parties agreed to normalize the bilateral relationship and pursued peaceful co-operation and partnership. The bilateral relations recovery process was started on 1 June 1966 when the foreign ministers of two nations signed the Bangkok Accord to end hostility and confrontation. Followed by Jakarta Accord signed on 11 August 1966 in Jakarta, marked the re-establishment of bilateral relations. In September 1967 Indonesian Liaison Office was opened in Kuala Lumpur, which led to the establishment of the Indonesian embassy.

In 1967, both countries, together with the Philippines, Singapore and Thailand, founded ASEAN to ensure peace and stability in the region. Since the 1970s, under the Suharto and Mahathir administrations, both countries enjoy a relatively cordial and close relationship, stemmed from both proximity and serumpun (kinship) spirit. However, some diplomatic spats have occurred that at times put tensions on bilateral relations. These range from territorial disputes, treatment of migrant workers to accusations of cultural theft.

In early 1965, a group of Indonesian soldiers blew up a building in Singapore (while it was still a part of Malaysia). Two of the soldiers were arrested and sentenced to death. The execution took place in 1968.

== Territorial disputes ==
Most of the current borders of Malaysia and Indonesia were inherited from Dutch East Indies and, British Malaya and Borneo colonial rule. The border between the two countries consists of a 1,881 km (1,169 m) land border and also includes maritime boundaries along the Straits of Malacca, in the South China Sea and in the Celebes Sea.

Currently, both nations are in a territorial dispute over the oil-rich sea block of Ambalat. Previously, they were over territorial disputes over the islands of Ligitan and Sipadan, which were won by Malaysia.

The recent border disputes have arisen in Straits of Malacca and the South China Sea area mainly because of the disagreement on exact locations of maritime naval borders in these waters. Both parties involved in arresting and detaining their counterpart's officials and fishers accused of territorial breaching violations and illegal fishing.

== Defense cooperation ==
During the New Order era, when the government decree was issued on March 12, 1966, Indonesia banned the spread of communism and banned its organizations. At that time there was a communist movement called North Kalimantan Communist Party (NKCP) in West Kalimantan and Sarawak. At that time, Indonesia and Malaysia then worked together to carry out the purge because the communists were considered a common enemy.

== Migrant workers ==
Indonesian migrant workers (Indonesian: TKI abbreviation of Tenaga Kerja Indonesia) have become an important issue between both countries. From the 1980s to the 1990s, Malaysia saw economic growth and development, industrialization, and modernization. With its large population and abundant workforce, Indonesian workers began to regard Malaysia as an attractive destination for work as a means of improving their economic situation. In 1997 both Indonesia and Malaysia were hit by a financial crisis that prompted the fall of the Indonesian Suharto regime. Large numbers of Indonesians lost their jobs, and Indonesian migrant workers began to pour into Malaysia, many of whom were illegal.

Indonesian migrant workers are plagued with issues such as poverty, human trafficking, abuse, and extortion. Approximately 300,000 domestic workers, most of them from Indonesia, are employed in Malaysia. Many work up to 18 hours a day, seven days a week, for wages of 400 to 600 ringgit (US$118–177) a month, and typically must turn over the first six to seven months of their salary to repay exorbitant recruitment fees. Some suffer physical or sexual violence from their employers. In 2009, Indonesia stopped sending domestic workers to Malaysia until both countries agreed on how to protect them. Indonesia resumed sending migrant workers to Malaysia in December 2011 after both countries signed a memorandum of understanding about worker protection in April of that year.

== Culture relations ==
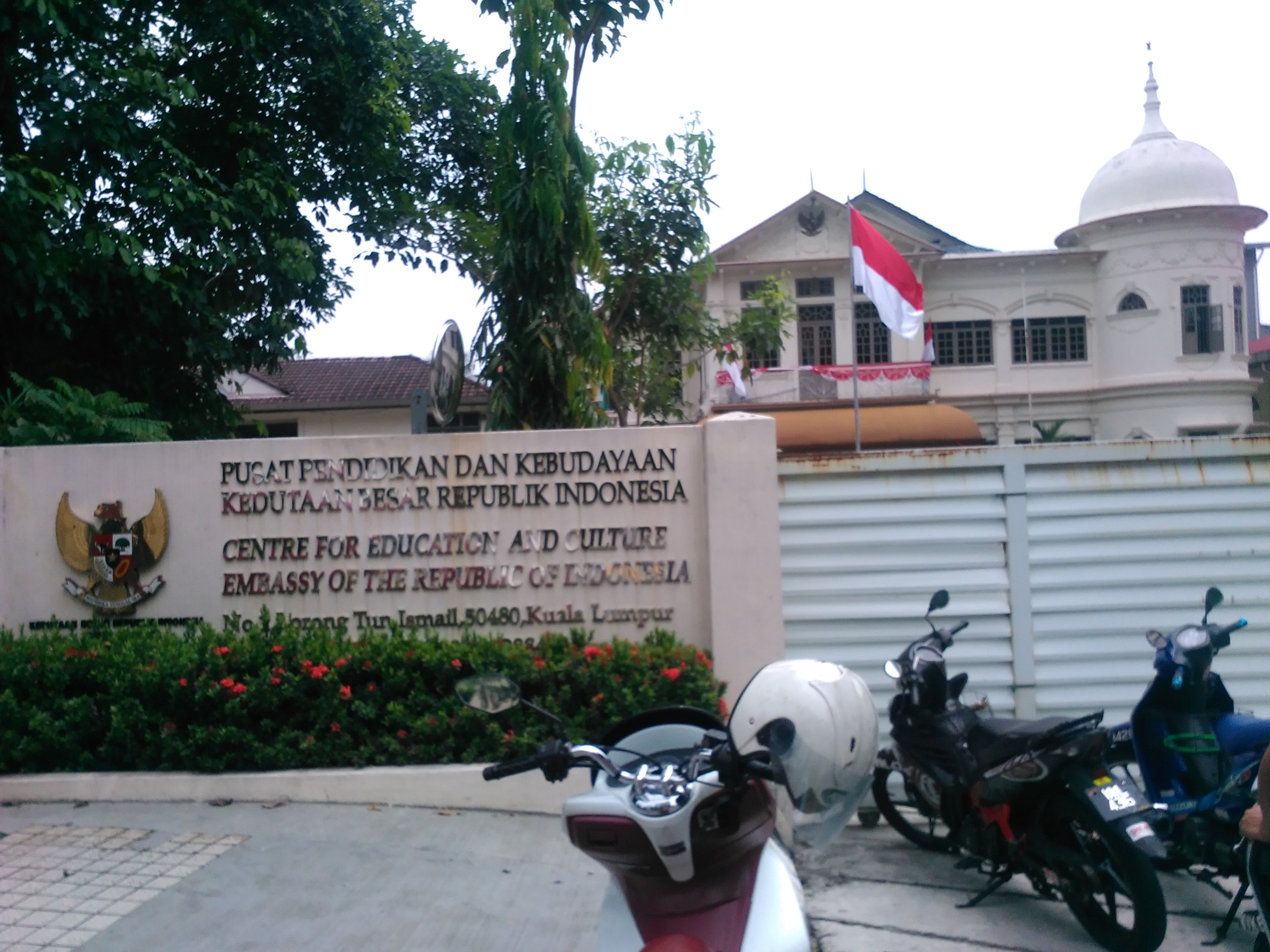
Centre for Education and Culture of the Embassy of the Republic of Indonesia in Kuala Lumpur.

Because of many similarities and shared cultures between Indonesia and Malaysia—also because of significant numbers of Indonesian-origin immigrants in today's Malaysian demographic—both countries are often involved in cultural disputes. Through an intensive tourism campaign, Malaysia has featured some famous cultural icons, namely the Rasa Sayang song, batik textile, wayang kulit shadow-puppet play and barongan dance. This tourism promotion and cultural campaign had alarmed and upset certain Indonesians who believe that these arts and cultures belong solely to them. As the reaction, many Indonesians felt the need to safeguard their cultural legacies, and to the extreme developed anti-Malaysian sentiments. In 2009, the Pendet controversy fuelled again the cultural disputes among neighbours, although this time it was not from Malaysia's official accounts. The advertisement promoting Discovery Channel's programme "Enigmatic Malaysia" featured a Balinese Pendet dance which it incorrectly showed to be a Malaysian dance.

Disputes over the origins of a variety of dishes found in both countries is also a perpetual issue, from rendang to lumpia (known as popiah in Malaysia) or even dishes as simple as nasi goreng and pisang goreng. The claims to an extent also overlap with neighboring Singapore. Although the dispute never led to a severe confrontation between the two countries, and politicians of both sides even acknowledged it as "petty", in Indonesia, an activist group held a demonstration in front of the Malaysian Embassy in Jakarta to protest the origin of the dish lumpia in February 2015. Similar reaction also occurred during the barongan and pendet controversy respectively.

On the other hand, the shared language and culture have their own benefits on connecting the people of both countries. The national language of Indonesia is a standard variety of "Riau Malay", which despite its common name is not the Malay dialect native to the Riau Islands, but rather the Classical Malay of the Malaccan royal court used in Malay Peninsula. In 1972, Indonesia and Malaysia each adopted a spelling reform plan, called the Perfected Spelling System (Ejaan yang Disempurnakan) in Indonesia and the New Rumi Spelling (Ejaan Rumi Baharu) in Malaysia in an effort of harmonizing spelling differences between the two countries. Although the representations of speech sounds are now largely identical between the Indonesian and Malaysian varieties, a number of minor spelling differences remain.

Various Indonesian music, films and sinetrons are popular in Malaysia. Numerous Indonesian bands and musicians have their fan-base in Malaysia and often performed some concerts in Malaysia. Vice versa, Malaysian singers such as Sheila Majid and Siti Nurhaliza are beloved and popular in Indonesia as well. Malaysian animation Upin & Ipin with deep Malay culture had also gained wide popularity and appeal among Indonesian children and families. However, this cultural exchange is not always appreciated; the overwhelming popularity of Indonesian music in Malaysia had alarmed the Malaysian music industry. In 2008, the Malaysian music industry demanded the restriction of Indonesian songs on Malaysian radio broadcasts.

Additionally, the two nations are fierce rivals in international association football. Competitive matches between the Indonesian and Malaysian team are famed for their enormous turnout and intense atmosphere, whether the tie is held in Malaysia or Indonesia. In recent years, a series of Indonesian fan violence broke out in Indonesia, especially when the country is facing Malaysia in the match.

== Environment ==
The slash and burn practices to clear the lands for Indonesian palm plantations in Sumatra and Kalimantan have caused haze and smoke fog that have been blown northwards by wind and have reached Malaysia, Singapore, Brunei and, to a lesser degree, the Philippines and Thailand. A series of Southeast Asian haze events occurred in 1997, 2005, 2006 and 2009, and reached the highest haze pollutant levels in June 2013.

The haze is hazardous for health and dangerous for transportation, especially flight safety in the region. The trans-border haze problems have strained diplomatic relations between Indonesia and Malaysia, and also with Singapore. The Malaysian and Singaporean governments had noted their protest and urged the Indonesian government to reduce the hot-spots. At the peak of the haze that usually occurs during the dry season, Malaysia and Singapore offer assistance to put off the fires. The Indonesian government has banned the slash and burn practice. However, the method is still widely used to clear palm oil plantation lands.

Another important environmental issue is trans-border illegal logging. The Indonesian government has expressed the concern that many rain forests along the Indonesia—Malaysia borders in Borneo were suffering illegal logging, mostly done by Malaysian loggers. The concern was aroused because Malaysian authorities seem to be doing nothing to prevent the crime and even seem to be encouraging this practice to increase Malaysian timber yield.

== Media ==
Malaysians expressed their concern that media in Indonesia seems to encourage and foster anti-Malaysia sentiments through distorted news coverage, exaggerations, and blowing the issues beyond the proportions. The Malaysian government is concerned about anti-Malaysia sentiments, protest and aggressive actions of certain extremists amid the bilateral spats over the Pendet controversy and the mistreatment of Indonesian housemaids in Malaysia. Malaysia government also stated that they had run out of patience and sent a protest letter to Indonesia after a demonstration triggered by a maritime dispute in Indonesia.

On the other hand, the Indonesian media has accused the government-controlled media in Malaysia of presenting negative opinions and poor images of Indonesia and Indonesian people as a political agenda to prevent the Indonesian reformation and democratic movement from spilling beyond its borders. The government of Indonesia also had sent the notes of protest for Malaysian media on using the term Indon to refer to Indonesia and Indonesian people that is now considered as a derogatory.

== Trade and economy ==
Malaysian companies that are investing in Indonesia are Maybank, CIMB, Petronas, Tabung Haji, Proton Holdings and Sime Darby, as stated by the Yang di-Pertuan Agong in his message to Malaysians in Indonesia while he and the Raja Permaisuri Agong were on a state visit to Indonesia in December 2012. Both countries are actively pursuing subregional economic co-operation to develop trans-border economic zones and free-trade areas that could generate a regional economy, such as Sijori (Singapore-Johor-Riau) on the west and BIMP-EAGA in the east region. In December 2017, both countries alongside Thailand launched a framework to allow the use of local currencies in settlement of trade between them.

In 2017, Indonesia was Malaysia's seventh-largest source of imports, while Malaysia was Indonesia's fourth-largest source of imports. The 2017 data from the World Bank indicated that Malaysia had a positive balance of trade with Indonesia of around 600 million US dollars.

== Tourism ==
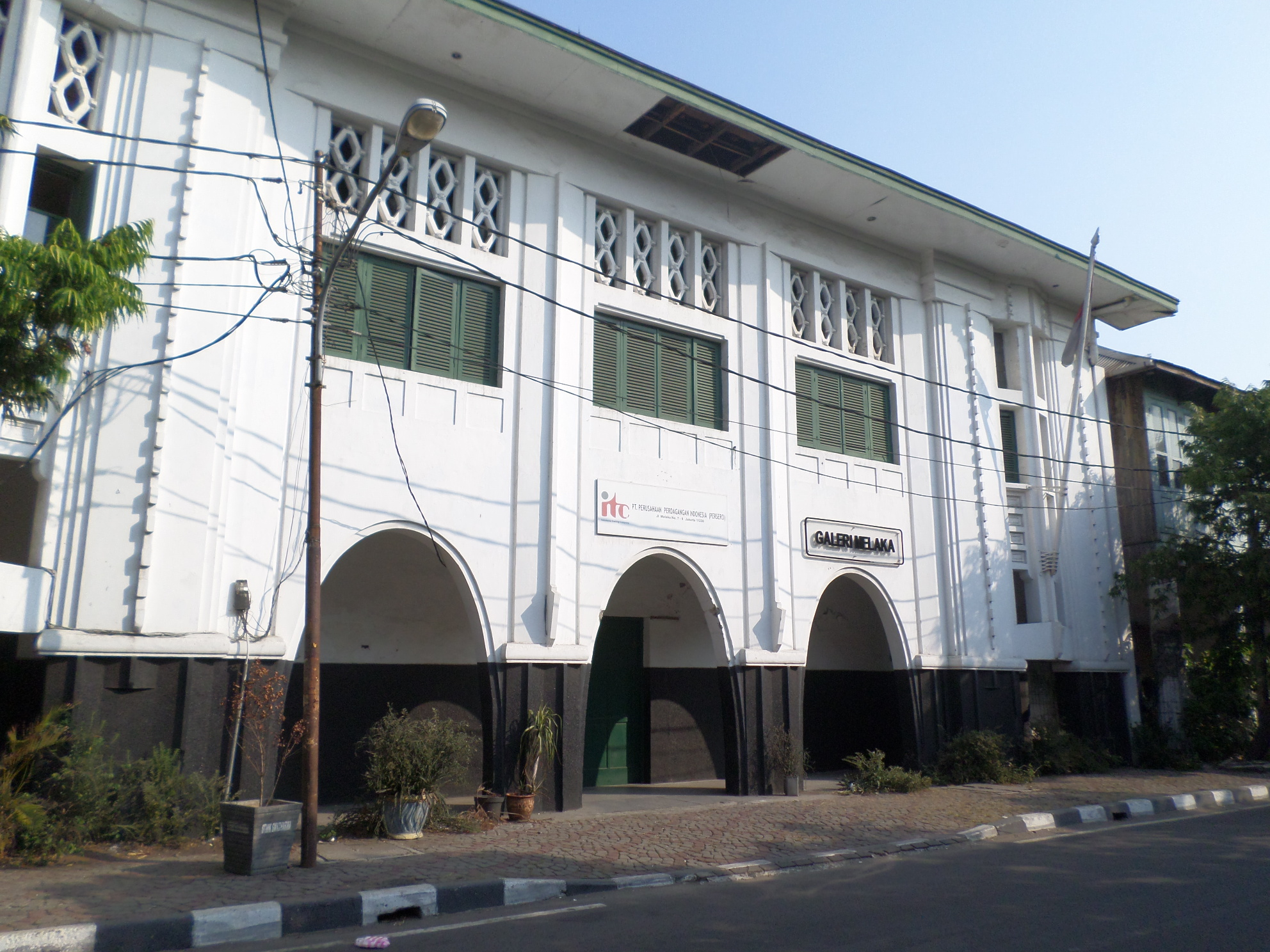
Malacca Gallery in Jakarta.

Because of their proximity, travellers from both countries are an essential source of visitors that generates the travel and tourism industry. Indonesians are the second-largest visitors to Malaysia, reaching 2,548,021 visitors in 2013. On the other hand, Malaysians are also the second-largest visitors to Indonesia, reaching 1,302,237 travellers in 2011. The top visitors of both countries are Singaporean visitors. Kuala Lumpur, Malacca and Penang are popular destinations for Indonesian travelers, and vice versa Bandung, Medan and Bukittinggi are particularly famous among Malaysian tourists.

== Education ==
As of December 2012, about 6,000 Malaysians are studying in Indonesia while about 14,000 Indonesians are studying in Malaysia.

== Resident diplomatic missions ==
- Indonesia has an embassy in Kuala Lumpur and consulates-general in George Town, Johor Bahru, Kota Kinabalu, Kuching and has a consulate in Tawau.
- Malaysia has an embassy in Jakarta, a consulate-general in Medan and consulates in Pekanbaru and in Pontianak.

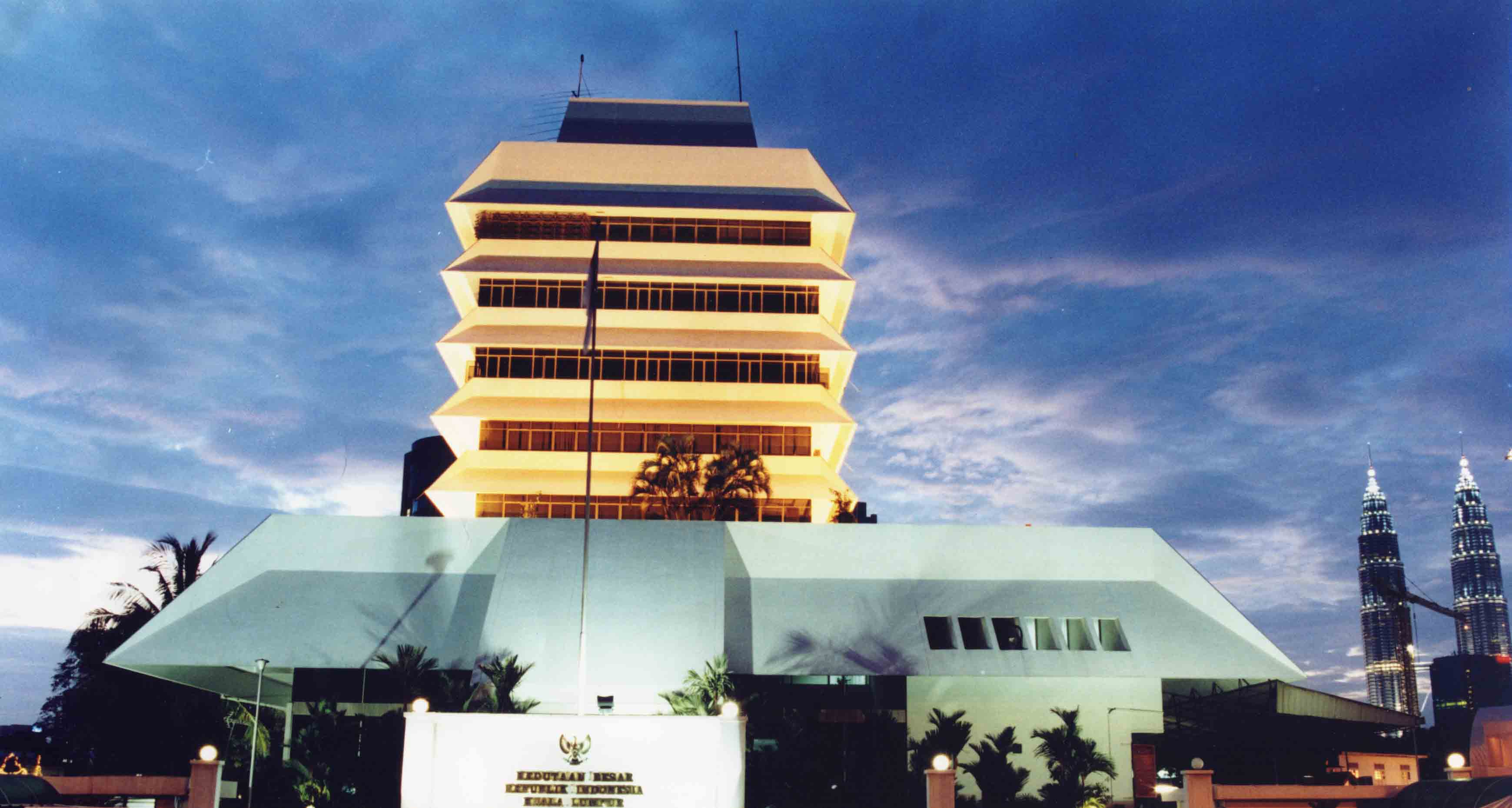
Embassy of Indonesia in Kuala Lumpur

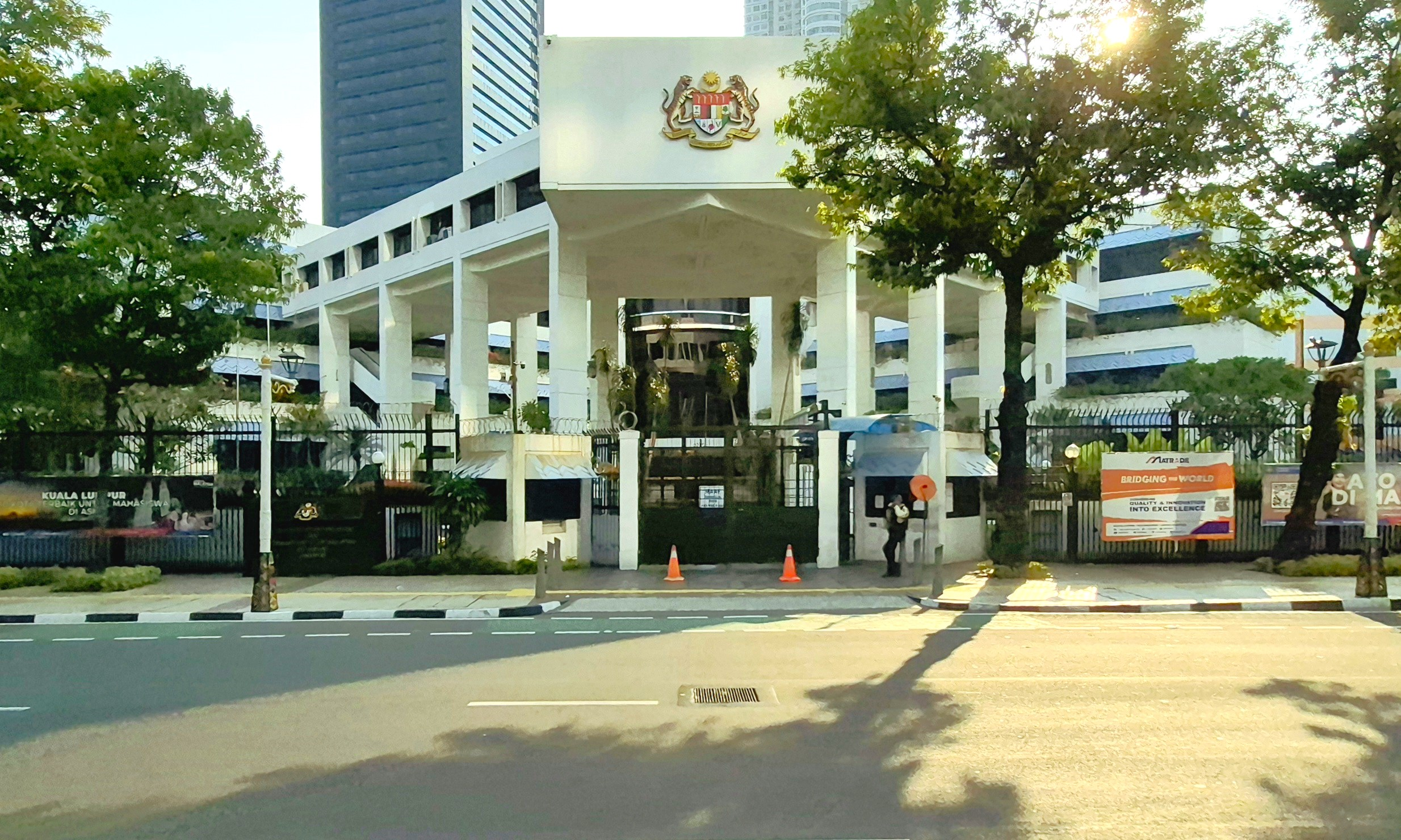
Embassy of Malaysia in Jakarta.

== See also ==
- Indonesia–Malaysia border
- Indonesia–Malaysia confrontation
- East ASEAN Growth Area
- Sijori Growth Triangle
- Greater Indonesia
- Maphilindo
- Malaysians of Indonesian descent
