= 2009 Pendet controversy =

Pendet Dance Controversy
- Part of Indonesia–Malaysia relations
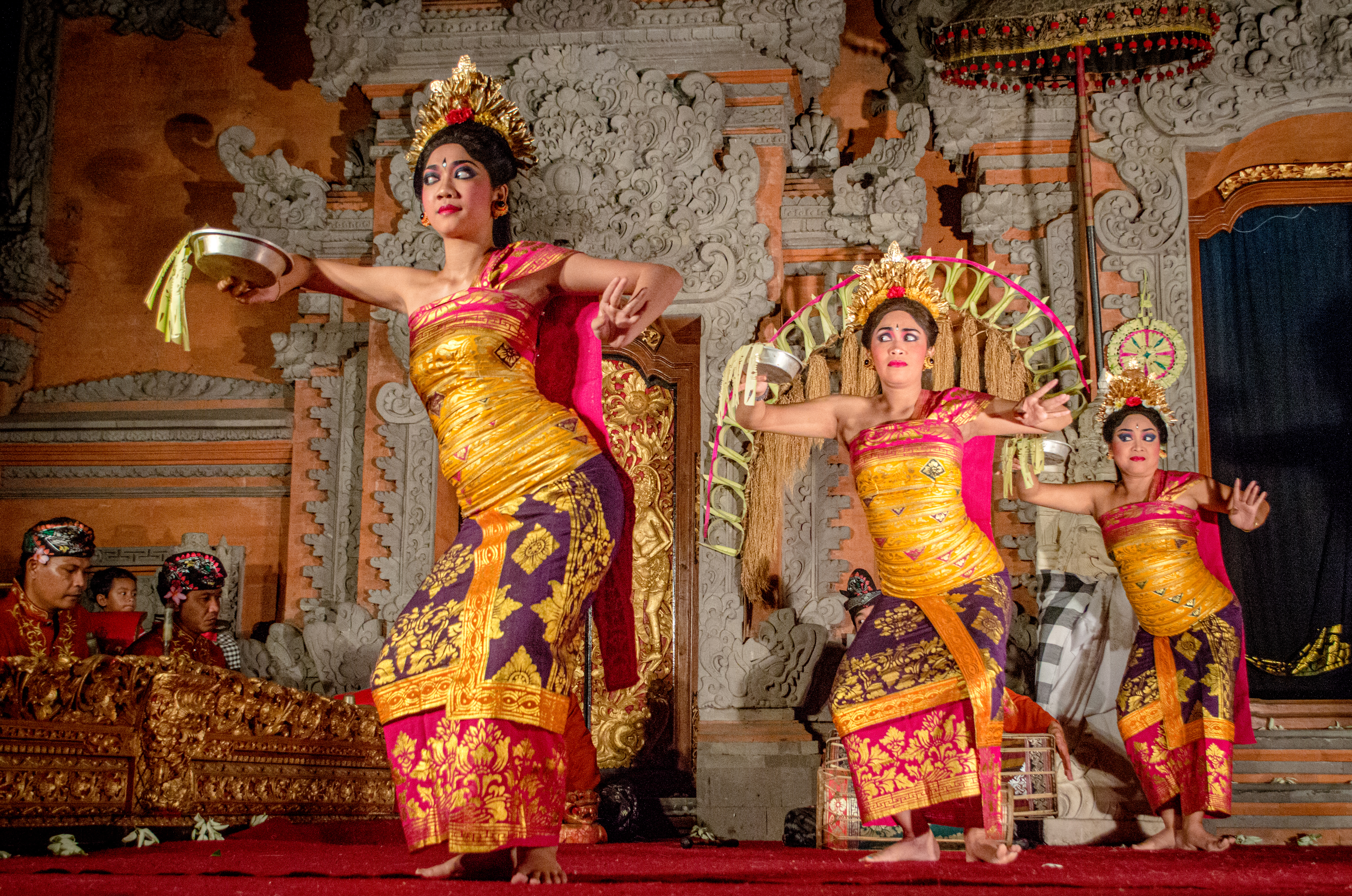
- Pendet dancers from Bali, Indonesia
- Date: August–October 2009
- Location: Indonesia and Malaysia
- Caused by: Misidentification of the Pendet dance as Malaysian in a Discovery Channel advertisement
- Methods: Protests, diplomatic communication, calls for apology
- Status: Resolved with an apology from Discovery Channel
- Result: Apology from Discovery Channel; tensions between Indonesia and Malaysia

Parties
Indonesia	Malaysia

Lead figures
Jero Wacik (Indonesian Minister of Tourism)	Mohamed Tajudeen Abdul Wahab (Malaysian National Security Council Secretary)
- Indonesian ultra-nationalist groups organized anti-Malaysia protests, including symbolic "war" preparations

An advertisement for the Discovery Channel program Enigmatic Malaysia in 2009 featured Balinese Pendet dancers, wrongly identifying the Pendet dance as Malaysian. This mistake caused public outrage in Indonesia, leading to protests and requests for an apology from Malaysia.

== Background ==
=== August 2009: Advertisement and Initial Reactions ===
The advertisement was created by a private company in Singapore for Discovery Channel’s *Enigmatic Malaysia* program. The incorrect label of Pendet as a Malaysian dance caused strong reactions in Indonesia, where cultural experts, government officials, and the tourism ministry demanded Malaysia explain the mistake.

=== August 2009: Apology and Further Issues ===
The Malaysian government clarified that it was not responsible for the ad, and Discovery Channel later apologized, accepting the blame for the mistake. Indonesia’s tourism minister, Jero Wacik, however, rejected the informal apology over the phone, asking for a formal written apology to make it official.

== Reactions ==
=== Late August 2009: Media and Public Outrage ===
Even after Discovery Channel’s apology, Indonesian news outlets continued to report the clip as a Malaysian government advertisement, increasing public anger. Indonesian ultra-nationalist groups, like Gemars, organized protests, collected supplies, and began military-style training for a “war” against Malaysia.

=== September 2009: Security Alerts and Bendera Threats ===
In response to these threats, Malaysia’s National Security Council secretary, Datuk Mohamed Tajudeen Abdul Wahab, directed Malaysian military and border patrols to tighten security. This was due to the nationalist group Benteng Demokrasi Rakyat (Bendera), which had previously set up roadblocks in Menteng, Jakarta. The group threatened to “invade” Malaysia with 1,500 members carrying sharpened bamboo spears via air, land, and sea on 08/10/2009.

=== University Protests and Flag Burning ===
Several Indonesian universities saw protests where students burned Malaysian flags, including:

- University of Palangka Raya
- Pakuan University
- Sultan Ageng Tirtayasa University
- State Islamic Institute (IAIN) of Sultan Maulana Hasanuddin, Banten
- Muhammadiyah University of Ponorogo
- University of Indonesia
- STIAMI Higher School
- August 17 University of Banyuwangi
- Sunan Giri University
- Riyadlotul Mujahidin Islamic Institute
- August 17 University of Samarinda

=== Diplomatic Communication and Security Assurances ===
The Malaysian Foreign Minister contacted the Indonesian ambassador to explain Malaysia’s concerns about the safety of Malaysian citizens in Indonesia. In response, Indonesian authorities, including the Chief of the Indonesian National Police, assured Malaysia they would protect Malaysians in Indonesia.
