= Pakuan University =

Private university in Bogor, Indonesia

Coordinates: 6.5994°S 106.8123°E

- Universitas Pakuan
- Motto: Unggul, Mandiri, dan Berkarakter (Indonesian)
- Motto in English: Excellent, Autonomous, and Strong Character
- Type: Private university
- Established: 1980
- Rector: Dr. Bibin Rubini, MPd
- Location: Bogor, West Java, Indonesia
- Website: unpak.ac.id

Pakuan University (UNPAK) is a private university in Bogor. It was established on 1 November 1980 under the Foundation Pakuan Siliwangi. Pakuan University is at Jl. Pakuan PO Box 452, Bogor. In the academic year 2025/2026, In total, UNPAK offers 41 different programs of study to its students. In 2025, the rector of the university is Didik Notosudjono.

== Structure ==
Pakuan University has six faculties:

1. Faculty of Law
2. Faculty of Economics
3. Faculty of Teacher Training & Education
4. Faculty of Social Sciences & Humanities
5. Faculty of Engineering
6. Faculty of Mathematics & Natural Sciences

The Faculty of Social Science & Humanities has four departments:

A. Indonesia Literature

B. English Literature

C. Japanese Literature

D. Communication Science

Communication science has four concentrations:

a. Public Relations

b. Communication Management

c. Journalism

d. Broadcasting
