= Sultan Ageng Tirtayasa University =

University in Banten, Indonesia

- Universitas Sultan Ageng Tirtayasa
- Official Emblem of Sultan Ageng Tirtayasa University
- Former names: Tirtayasa University (1981-2001); Sultan Ageng Tirtayasa University (2001-present)
- Type: Public university
- Established: 1981
- Rector: Prof. Dr. Ir. Fatah Sulaiman, ST., MT., IPM., ASEAN.Eng.
- Academic staff: 707 (2019)
- Students: 20,332 (2019)
- Undergraduates: 18,962
- Postgraduates: 1,370
- Location: Serang Regency, Banten, Indonesia
- Colors: Maroon
- Website: www.untirta.ac.id

Sultan Ageng Tirtayasa University (abbreviated as Untirta) is the state university in the province of Banten, Indonesia. The main campus is in Serang Regency, the faculty of engineering is at Cilegon, and Faculty of Education most of it is located in Ciwaru Serang. Sultan Ageng Tirtayasa University was established by the Tirtayasa Foundation.

Untirta has seven faculties: Law, Teacher Training and Education, Engineering, Agriculture, Economics, Social & Political Science, and Medicine.

== History ==
In 1984, Tirtayasa Education Foundation had the College of Law, College of Teacher Training and Education, and College of Technology; a decree by the Ministry of Culture and Education changed their status to Faculty of Law, Faculty of Teacher Training and Education and Faculty of Engineering. All faculties were determined by the listed status as faculty at Sultan Ageng Tirtayasa University. Then Untirta developed with the establishment of the Faculty of Agriculture and Faculty of Economics, with listed status.

On October 13, 1999, the decree of the President of the Republic of Indonesia set about preparation of establishment of the Sultan Ageng Tirtayasa University as a Public University. On March 19, 2001, Sultan Ageng Tirtayasa University became state university in the Ministry of National Education.

== Faculties ==
=== Faculty of Engineering ===
- Industrial Engineering
- Civil Engineering
- Electrical Engineering
- Metallurgical Engineering
- Chemical Engineering
- Mechanical Engineering
- Informatics
- Statistics

=== Faculty of Medicine and Health Sciences ===
- Medical Education
- Nutrition Science
- Nursing (D3 & S1)
- Sport Science

=== Faculty of Education and Teacher Training ===
- Mathematics Education
- Biology Education
- Non Formal Education
- Indonesian Literature and Language Education
- English Education
- Early Childhood Education
- Primary School Teachers Education
- Special Education
- Guidance and Counseling
- Physics Education
- Chemistry Education
- Natural Science Education
- Electrical Engineering Education
- Mechanical Engineering Education
- Citizen and Pancasila Education
- Socioogy Education
- History Education
- Education in Art Drama Dance and Music

=== Faculty of Agriculture ===
- Social Economics of Agriculture / Agribusiness
- Agroecotechnology
- Fishery
- Food Technology
- Marine Science
- Animal Science

=== Faculty of Social and Political Sciences ===
- Communication Science
- State Administration
- Government Science

=== Faculty of Law ===
- Law Science

=== Faculty of Economic and Business ===
- Accounting
- Management
- Economic Development
- Sharia Economics

=== Diploma ===
- Accounting
- Taxation
- Finance and Banking
- Marketing
- Nursing

=== Postgraduates ===
- Accounting
- Public Administration
- Law Science
- Agricultural Science
- Management
- Indonesian Education
- Mathematics Education
- English Education
- Learning Technology
- Chemical Engineering

== Campuses ==
=== Serang City ===
- Pakupatan Campus

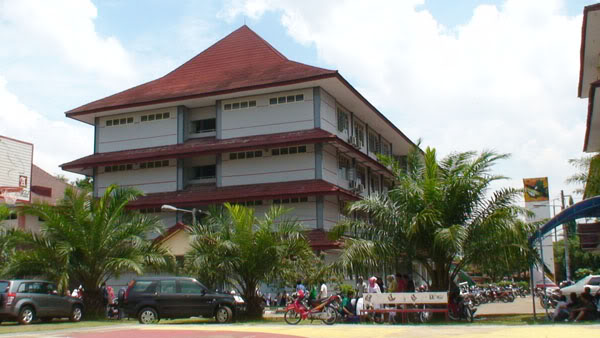
Untirta Lecture Building, Pakupatan Campus

This was the main campus before the Sindangsari Campus is inaugurated in 2021. Pakupatan Campus is located on KM 4 Jl. Raya Jakarta, Pakupatan, Cipocok Jaya District, Serang City, Banten Province. This campus now is for Diploma degree, Medical Faculty (except for Nursing Program) and Postraduate School.

- Ciwaru Campus

Ciwaru Campus for Faculty of Education and Teacher Training. The faculty has 18 study programs. The campus is located on Jl. Raya Ciwaru No. 25, Ciwaru, Cipare District, Serang City, Banten Province.

- Kepandean Campus

This campus for study program of Diploma 3 Nursing, Faculty of Medicine. Located on Jl. Letnan Jidun No. 2, Kepandean, Serang City, Banten Province.

=== Cilegon Campus ===
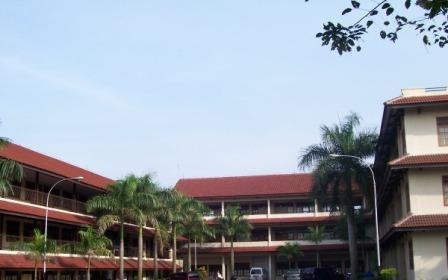
"Letter U" Building in Faculty of Engineering

This Campus has one faculty, The Faculty of Engineering. Cilegon Campus is on KM 3 Jl. Jenderal Sudirman, Cilegon, Banten Province.

=== Sindangsari Campus ===
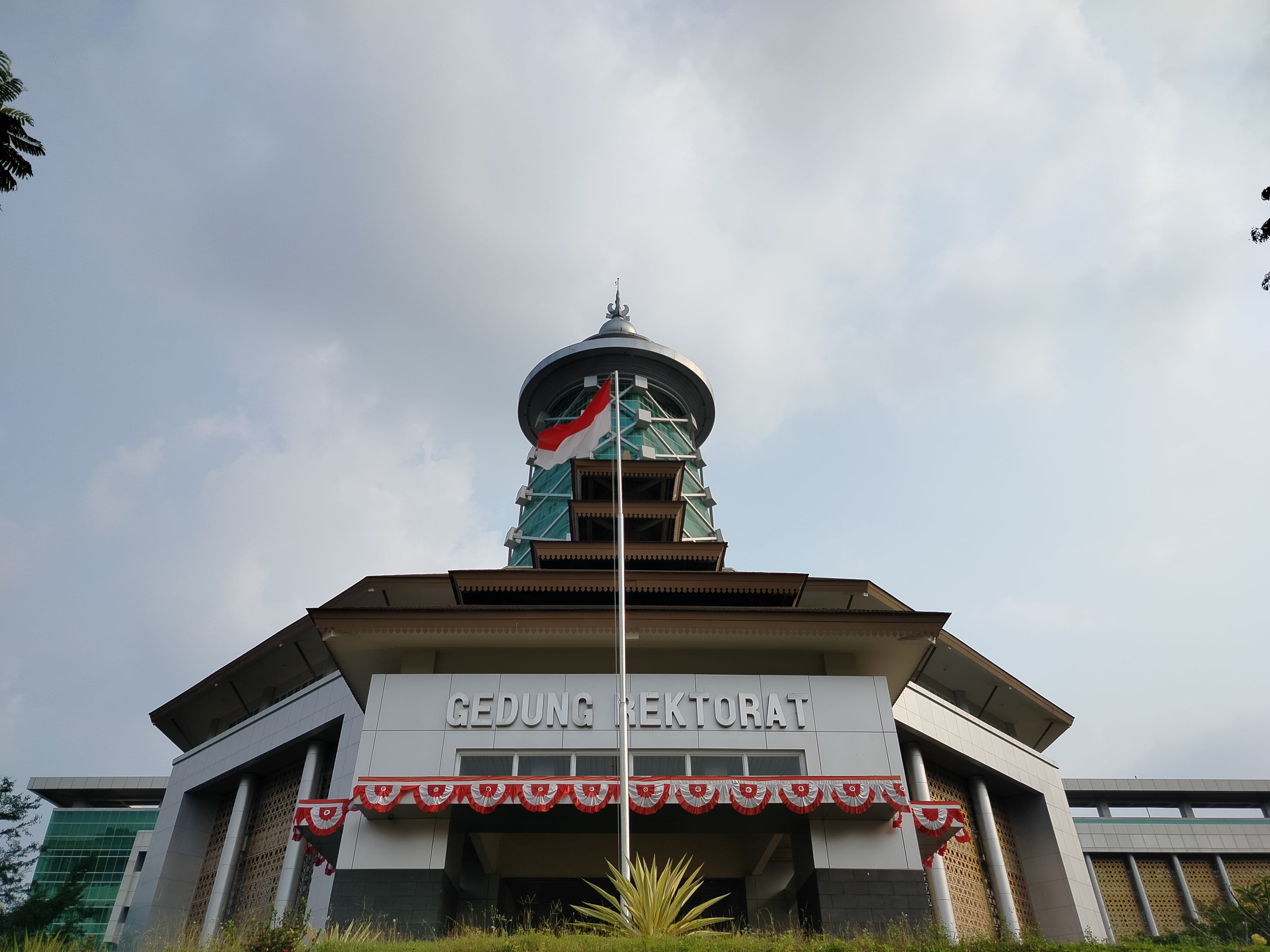
Untirta Rectorate Building, Sindangsari Campus

Sindangsari Campus is the new campus and become the main campus for Untirta since 2021. Located on Km 3 Jl. Palka, Sindangsari, Pabuaran District, Serang Regency, Banten Province. Four faculties are located in here:
• Faculty of Law
• Faculty of Agriculture
• Faculty of Economics and Business
• Faculty of Social and Political Science

== World rankings ==
Ranking system	World	Asia	Southeast Asia	Indonesia
EduRank 2026	7470	2903	-	97
uniRank 2026	2961	-	-	64
Webometrics 2026	2620	-	-	44
UI GreenMetric 2025	87	-	-	15

== Untirta Social Network ==
Sultan Ageng Tirtayasa University has social networking called Untirta Network dedicated to all in the academic community or anyone associated with the university.
