= Pendet dance =

Indonesian traditional dance

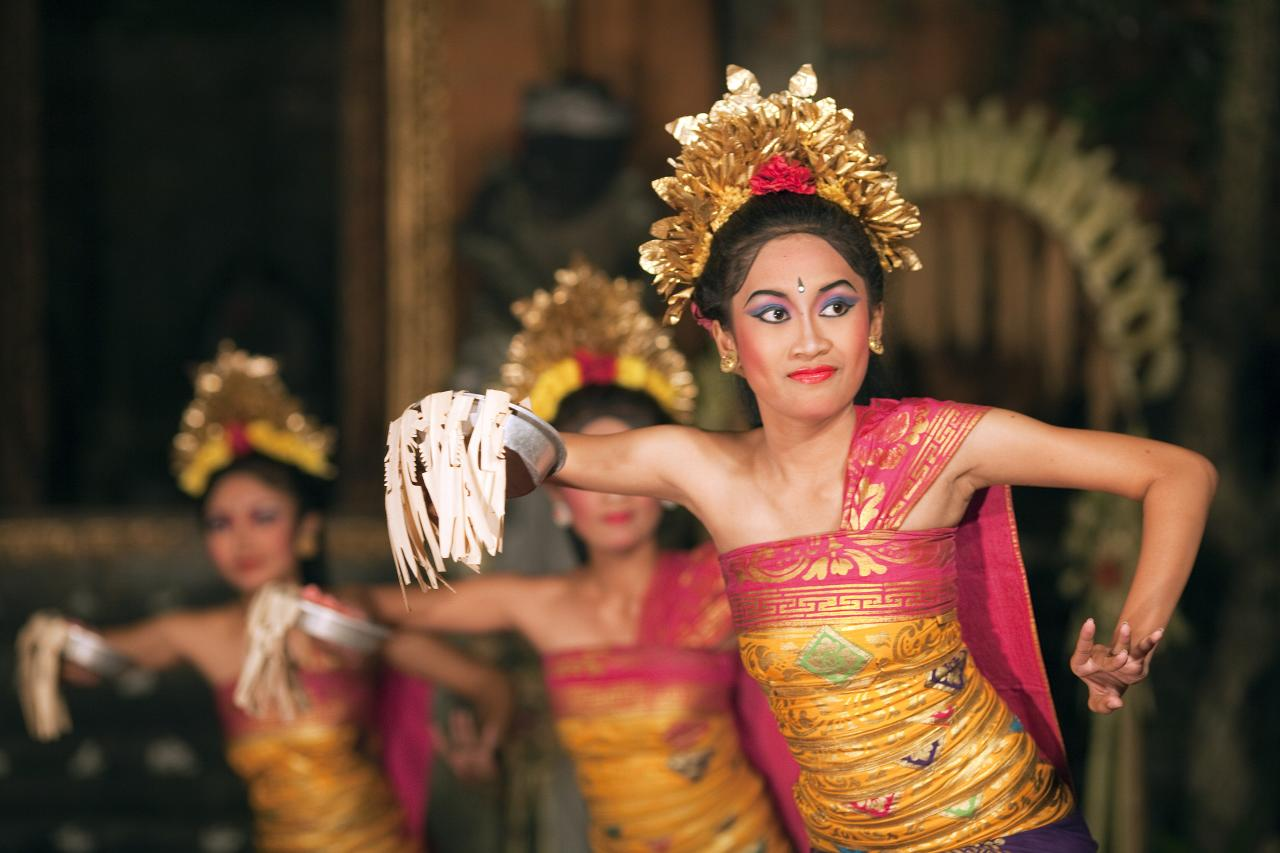
- Pendet dancers hold silver bowl of flowers
- Native name: ᬧᭂᬦ᭄ᬤᭂᬢ᭄ (Balinese); Tari Pendet (Indonesian)
- Genre: Traditional dance
- Instrument(s): Gamelan, Gong
- Inventor: Balinese
- Origin: Indonesia

Pendet dance (Balinese: ᬧᭂᬦ᭄ᬤᭂᬢ᭄, igélan pendet) is a traditional dance from Bali, Indonesia, in which floral offerings are made to purify the temple or theater as a prelude to ceremonies or other dances. Pendet is typically performed by young girls, carrying bowls of flower petals, handfuls of which are cast into the air at various times in the dance. Pendet can be thought of as a dance of greeting, to welcome the audience and invite spirits to enjoy a performance. It is one of the oldest Balinese dances, although the current form was codified in the 1950s.

== History ==
Traditional Balinese dances are the oldest form of performing arts in Bali. Traditional dances can be divided into two types: the sacred dances called Wali and entertainment dances called Bebalihan. Wali (sacred dances) are usually performed only during certain ritual ceremonies. Balinese Hindus believed that the sacred dances has strong religious significance and spiritual power, thus can only be performed during specific religious ceremony by specific dancers. Bebalihan are usually performed in social events. In addition to entertain, Bebalihan also has other purposes including welcoming guests, celebration of harvests, or gathering crowds. Bebalihan has more variations than Wali. Pendet is considered as a form of Bebalihan, often performed secularly to welcome guests or audiences.

Pendet believed as a representation of Balinese floral offering ritual, which offered banten or canang (floral offerings) from shrine to shrine within Balinese temple or residential compounds. Initially, Pendet dance is used as a complement of piodalan ceremonies in temples or family shrines, as a symbol of gratitude, respect, and joy when welcoming the presence of the gods who descend from khayangan (realm of gods). By the 1950s, the dance choreography, movements, costumes and properties were codified by two artists from Sumertha village, Denpasar; I Wayan Rindi and Ni Ketut Reneng. Both of them created Pendet as a welcome dance with four dancers, performed as part of a tourism show at a number of hotels in Denpasar, Bali. In 1961, I Wayan Beratha developed this dance and increased the number of dancers to five, as is often performed now.

In 1962, I Wayan Beratha and his colleagues developed Pendet dance as a mass dance. The number of dancers was no less than 800 people, and featured in the opening ceremony of the Asian Games in Jakarta.

== Performance and movements ==
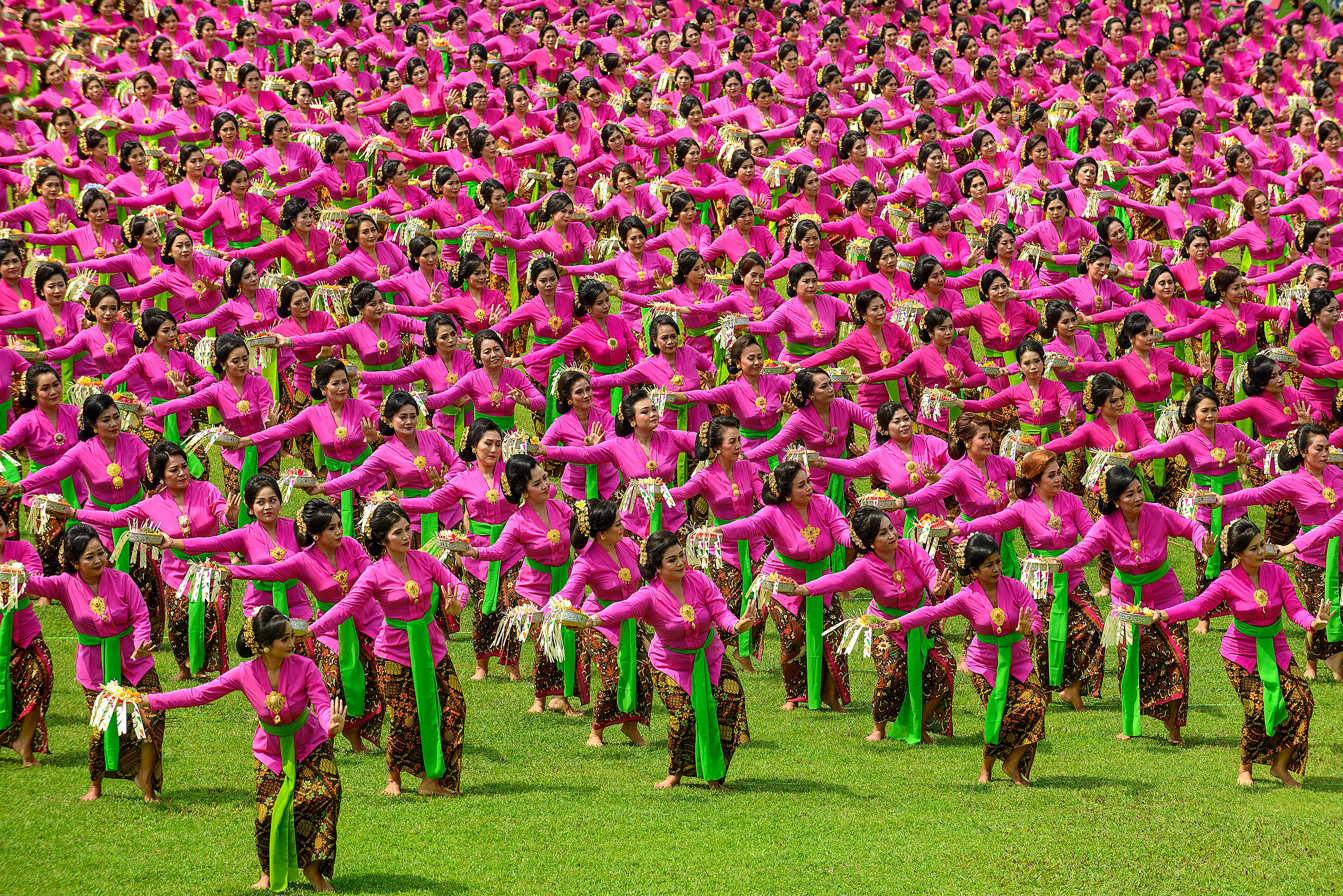
Pendet dance, performed by hundreds of dancers.

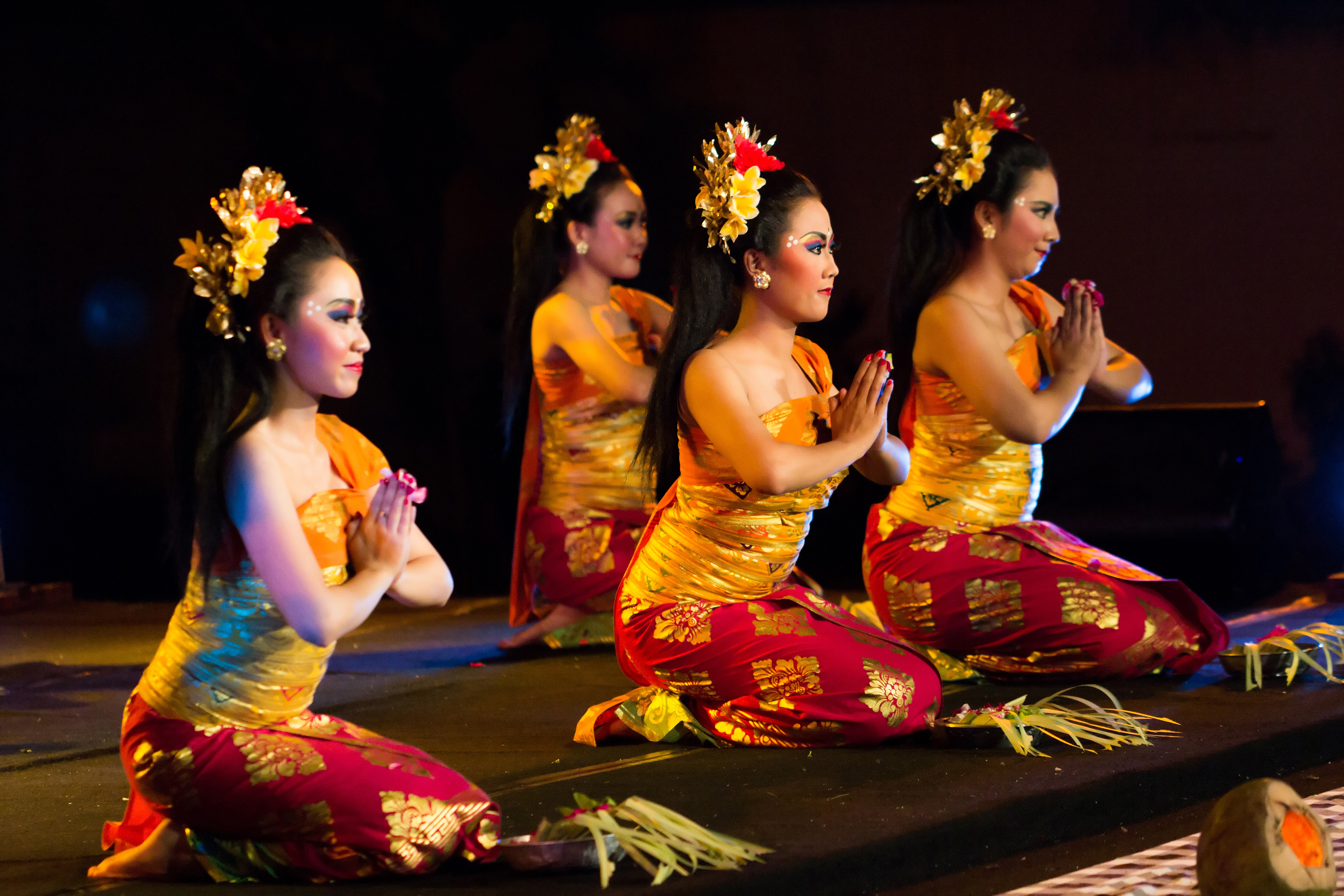
Pendet dancers offering a greeting.

The original Pendet dance is performed by 4-5 young pre-pubescent girls in the yards of Balinese Hindu temples. Pendet is the presentation of an offering in the form of a ritual dance. Unlike sacred ritual dances that demand arduous training, Pendet may be danced by anyone, taught simply by imitation.

Younger girls follow the movements of the elder women, who recognize their responsibility in setting a good example. Proficiency comes with age. As a religious dance, Pendet is usually performed during temple ceremonies.

All dancers carry in their right hand a small silver bowl containing offerings include colorful flower petals and incense. The bowl is decorated with yellow janur young palm leaves. The dance describes that the maiden dance from shrine to shrine within the temple. Pendet may be performed intermittently throughout the day and late into the night during temple feasts.

Pendet dancers bring flowers in small Bokor, silver bowls containing flowers in a ceremony. They spread the flowers around the temple. At the end of the performance, the maiden dancers would throw and sprinkle the flower petals towards the guests. This dance is a symbol of welcoming gods, spirits, and guests in some ritual ceremonies in Bali.

Pendet actually has simple dance movements. These movements are the basic dance movements of Balinese dance. Pendet has undergone later development with variations and now is not only performed in ritual ceremonies but also in some social events. Pendet since has been known as a welcoming dance.

== See also ==
- Dance in Bali
- Dance of Indonesia
- Balinese theater
- 2009 Pendet controversy
