= Malaysian cultural outfits =

Malaysian clothing

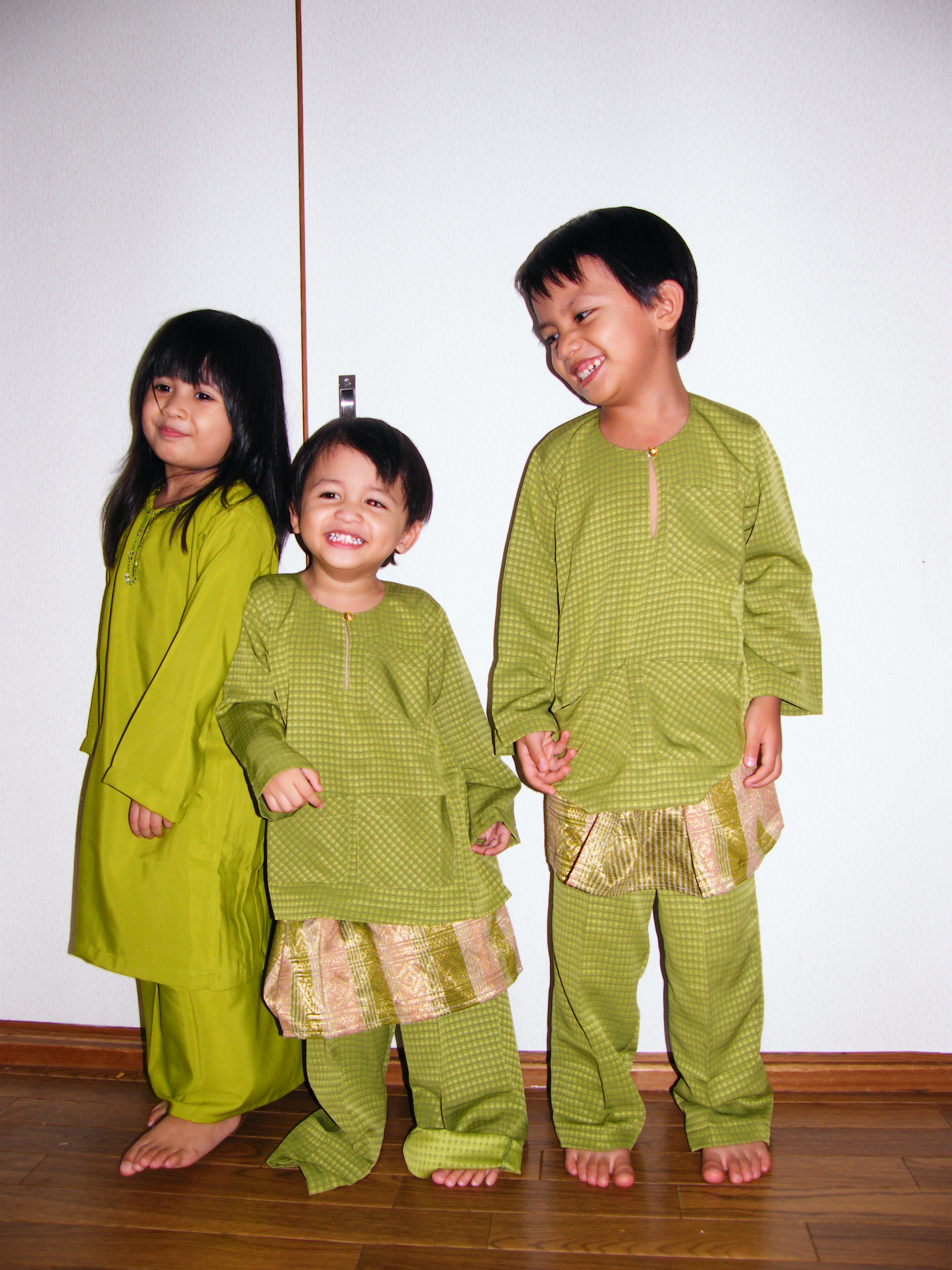
Malay children wearing traditional dresses during Hari Raya.

Pakaian (Jawi: ڤاکاين) is the term for clothing in Malaysia's national language. Since Malaysia is a multicultural nation: Malay, Chinese, Indian and hundreds of other indigenous groups of Malay Peninsula and Borneo, each has its own traditional and religious articles of clothing all of which are gender-specific and may be adapted to local influences and conditions. Previously, traditional clothes were worn daily. However, excluding Baju Melayu, Baju Kurung many are now only worn on special occasions such as marriage ceremonies and cultural events.

== History ==
Malaysian traditional clothing varies by region. Nevertheless, Malay clothing can be classified according to three distinct periods of history.

=== Early styles ===
Prior to the prevalence of Baju Kurung and Baju Kebaya, it is believed that kemban was the common woman's clothing of the ancient Malay Archipelago. Kemban is essentially a type of sarong, only worn by females. Traditionally, women wear two pieces of clothes; the lower one is wrapped around the hips covering lower parts of the body (hips, thighs, and legs) and is called kain sarong, while the piece that is wrapped around the upper body (chest and torso) is called kain kemban. The third piece of cloth called kain kelubung may also be used to cover the head (head, shoulders, and arms) from the scorching sun. On the other hand, the typical man's clothing only involved two pieces of clothes. A larger kain sarong wrapped around the waist which covered the lower part of the body, while a smaller piece tied around the head formed a headdress.

The only difference between the clothes worn by the members of the nobility and the common folk is the quality of cloth used. The members of the nobility used more expensive cloth such as batik, ikat, songket, or tenun, as well as wore elaborate jewelry made of gold and precious stones. Today, this shoulder-exposing dress still features in traditional Malay dances and rituals especially in Kelantan where it is regarded as an expression of aesthetics, elegance, and femininity.

=== Classical styles ===
==== Malacca ====
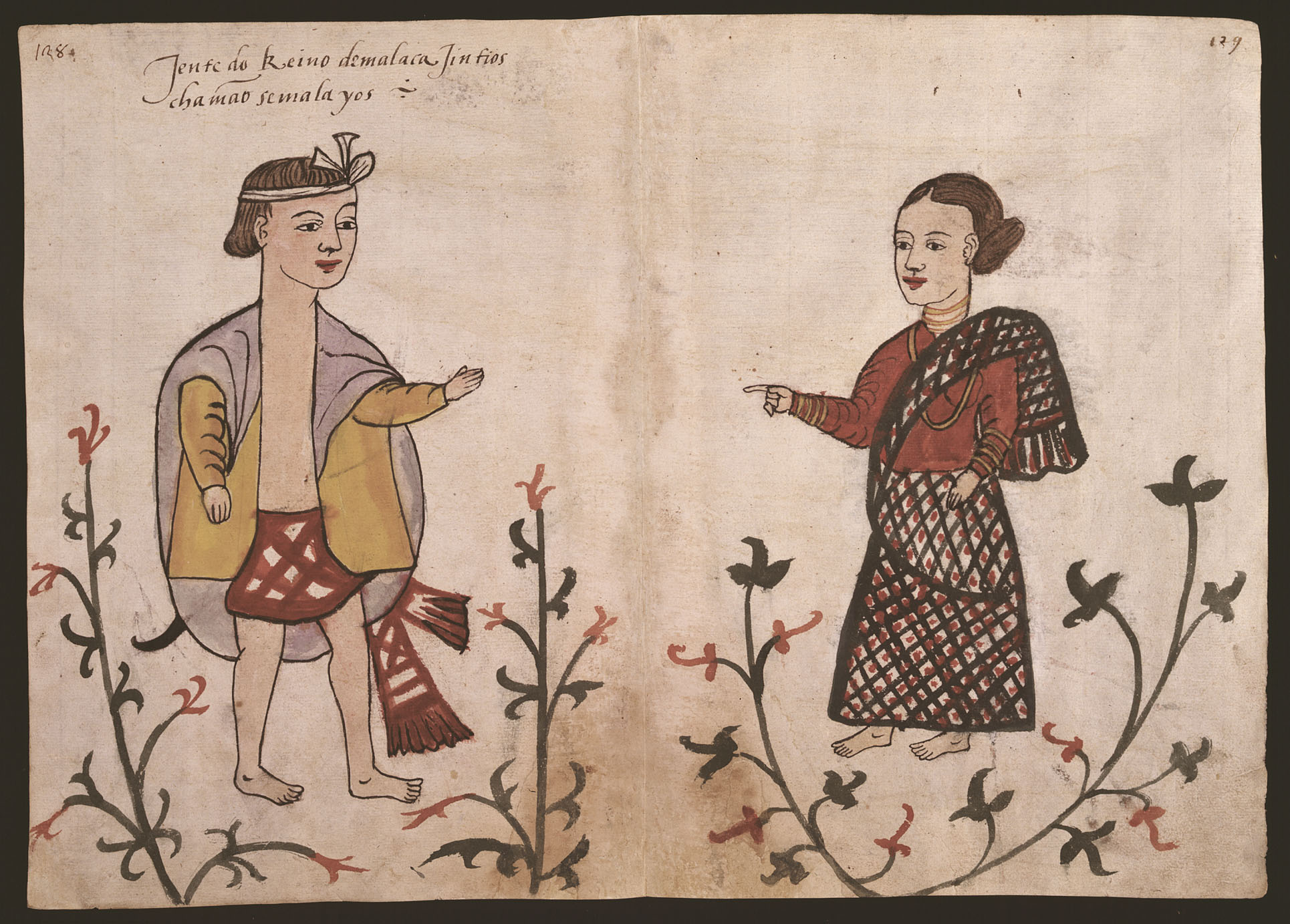
A Portuguese illustration of Malay traditional clothing (Baju Kurung), 1540.

Malacca was the strongest sultanate in the Malay Archipelago and was a center of entrepot trade, with traders from China, India, and the Middle East. According to the Sejarah Melayu (Malay Annals), Sultan Mansur Shah, the sixth Malaccan ruler, banned Malay women from wearing only a kemban as it ran contrary to personal modesty based on the Islamic teachings. With the guides from Tun Hassan Temenggong, the son of Bendahara Seri Maharaja Tun Mutahir, the traditional Baju Melayu and Baju Kurung were born, adopting different elements from around the world. This style of clothing then remained largely unchanged over the next three and a half centuries.

When the Portuguese conquered Malacca in 1511, they introduced the term cabaya from the Arabic word abaya to describe the blouse-dress traditionally worn throughout the archipelago. The features of Baju Kebaya is notably very similar to the traditional Malay Baju Kurung and Baju Belah. In the 16th or 17th century, this style of clothing was adopted by the multicultural communities of Portuguese Malacca. The appearance of European elements can be attributed to the role of the Portuguese and the Dutch during the colonial era. Today, the Kristang community in Malacca still wears the original Portuguese style kebaya as their traditional costume.

==== Johor ====
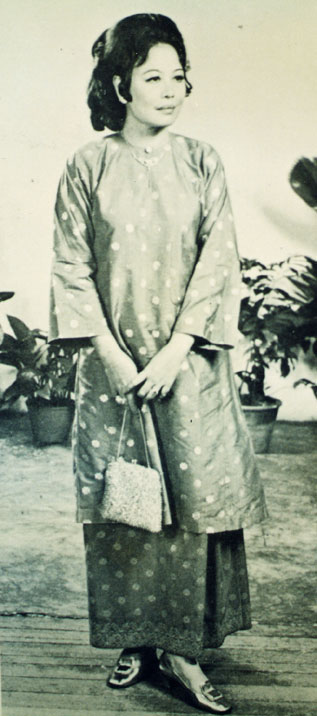
A Kedahan Malay lady wearing a traditional Baju Kurung with Teluk Belanga style

The earlier Baju Kurung was longer and looser. In Johor, another version of Baju Kurung emerged as it was first introduced during the reign of Sultan Abu Bakar to commemorate the move of Johor's capital from Teluk Belanga to Tanjung Puteri in 1866. Sultan Abu Bakar ordered that the woman's dress be down to below the knee with its neckline smooth and not baggy. The Teluk Belanga style has no collar and the neckline is stitched in various forms of embroidery. During the reign of Sultan Ibrahim, the dress was changed at the suggestion of the Jaafar bin Haji Muhammad, the first Menteri Besar of Johor, where a pocket was added onto the Baju Kurung. At the same time, the kain kelubung remained relevant as a part of women's dress right up to the 1930s. Today, the Teluk Belanga style is synonymous with the standard traditional Baju Kurung.

==== Kedah ====
In the northern Malay Peninsula, a style of clothing known as Baju Sikap is preferred by men and was worn as early as 1786. It is a part of the official attire of the Sultan of Kedah and has been worn for the past two centuries among the royal family of Kedah for state official ceremonies. Baju Sikap is considered one of the basic Malay clothing, that is a part of the Malay "suit six", usually worn during official events in Malaysia.

=== Modern styles ===
At the beginning of the 20th century, another style of kebaya was popularised by the Malaccan Peranakan community, where it is locally known as Kebaya Nyonya. This Nyonya style is different from its predecessors as it uses textiles with Chinese motifs that are intricately embroidered with Chinese techniques. This style of kebaya is usually accompanied by intricately hand-beaded shoes. Other than Malacca, this style is also popular in other straits settlements such as Penang and Singapore.

In 1960, Baju Muskat was first worn during the coronation of the third Yang di-Pertuan Agong inspired by Tunku Abdul Rahman when he became the first Prime Minister of Malaysia, who was a prince from Kedah. The Baju Muskat is a modified version of Baju Sikap from the official attire of Kedah State Government Officials and thus became one of the regalia of Malaysia.

In the 1950s, the selendang began replacing the larger kain kelubung. By the early 1980s, the Baju Kurung Moden, a style of Baju Kurung that closely followed western fashion and detailing flourished. The Baju Kurung continues to survive and prosper, especially due to its popularity during the Islamisation of Malaysia in the 1970s and 1980s as well as its introduction as a school uniform for public schools in the country.

== Varieties ==
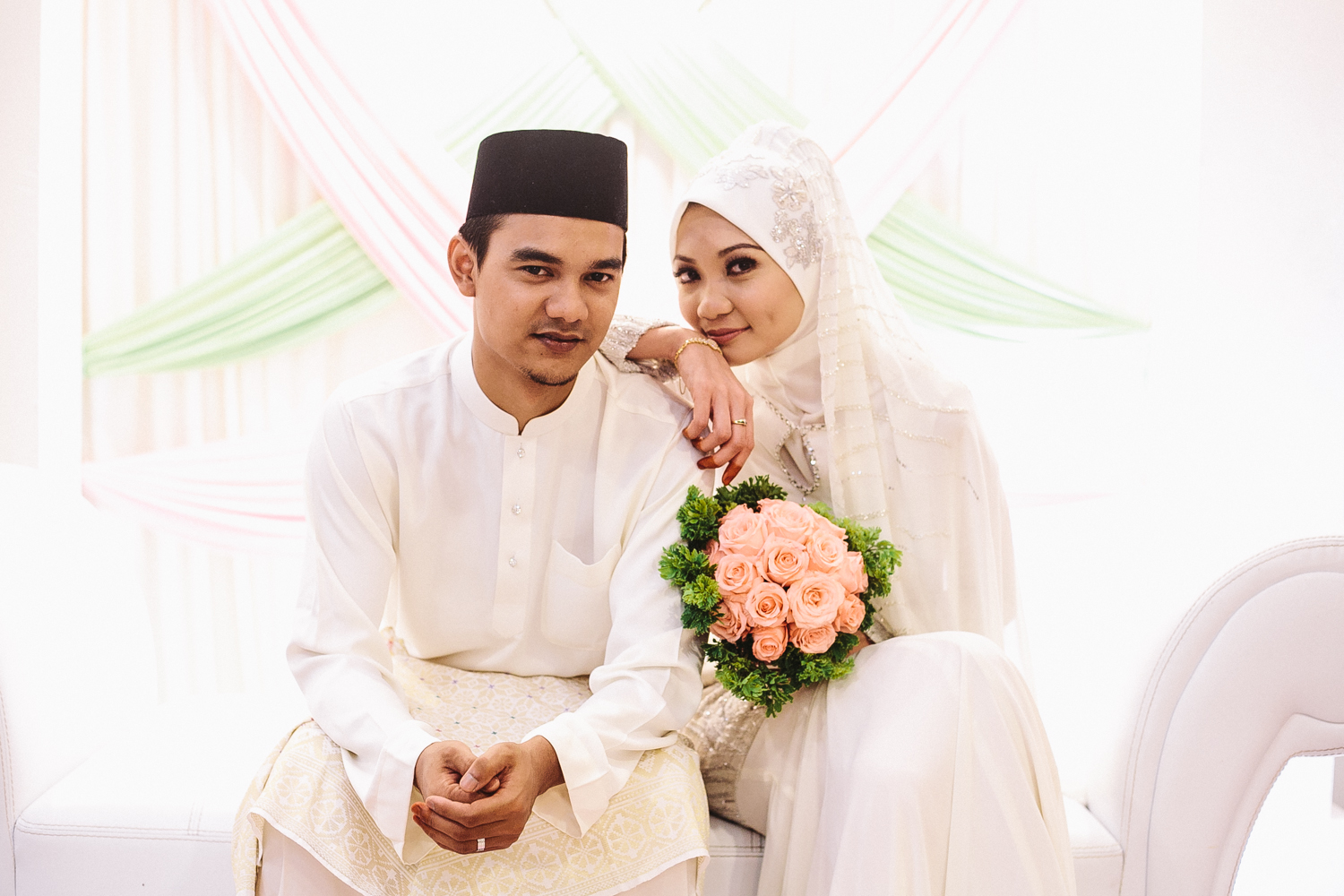
A Malay couple in traditional Malay clothing. The groom is wearing a Baju Melayu paired with songkok and samping, while the bride wears Baju Kurung with a tudong.

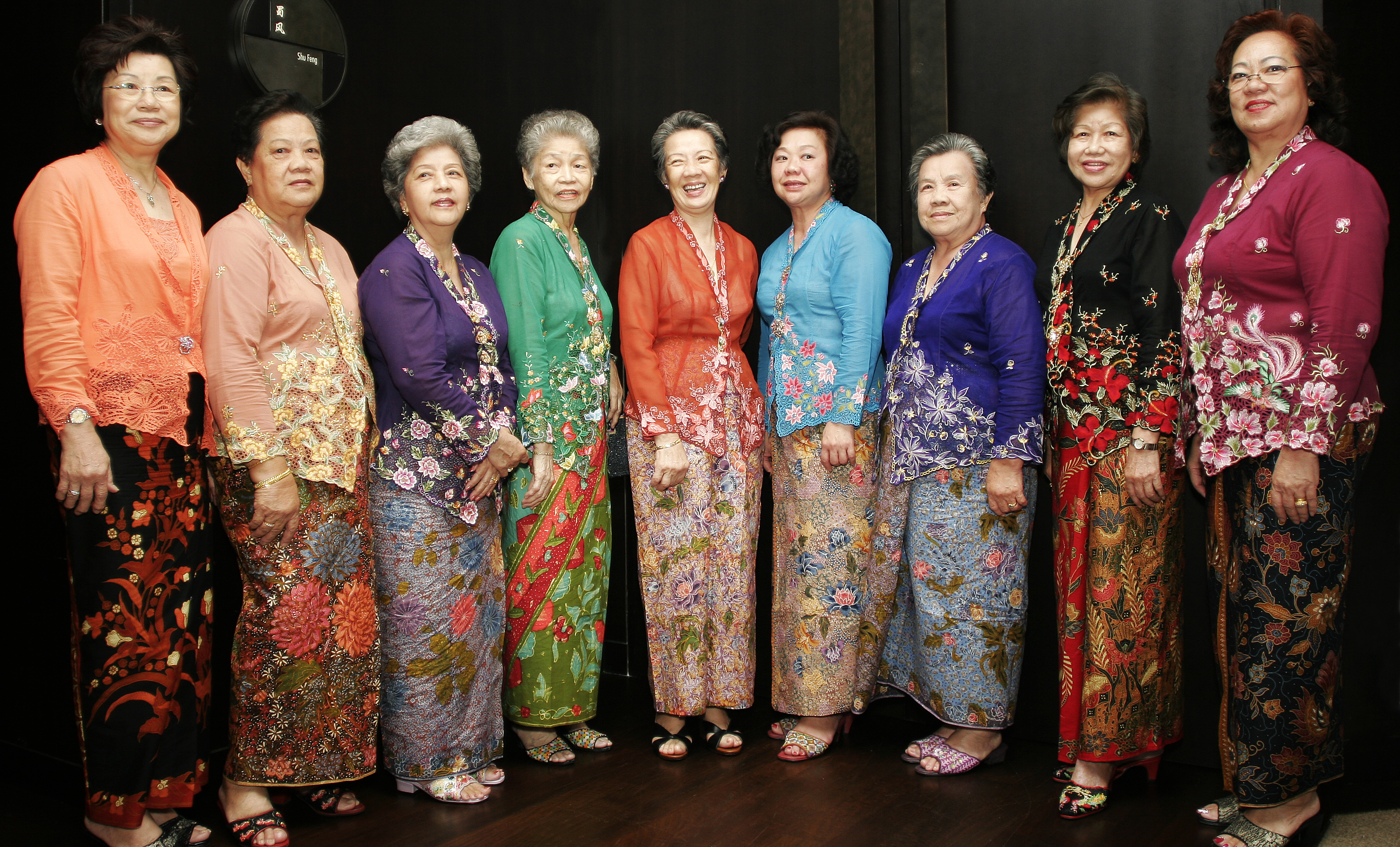
A group of women posing in traditional Peranakan style Nyonya Kebaya.

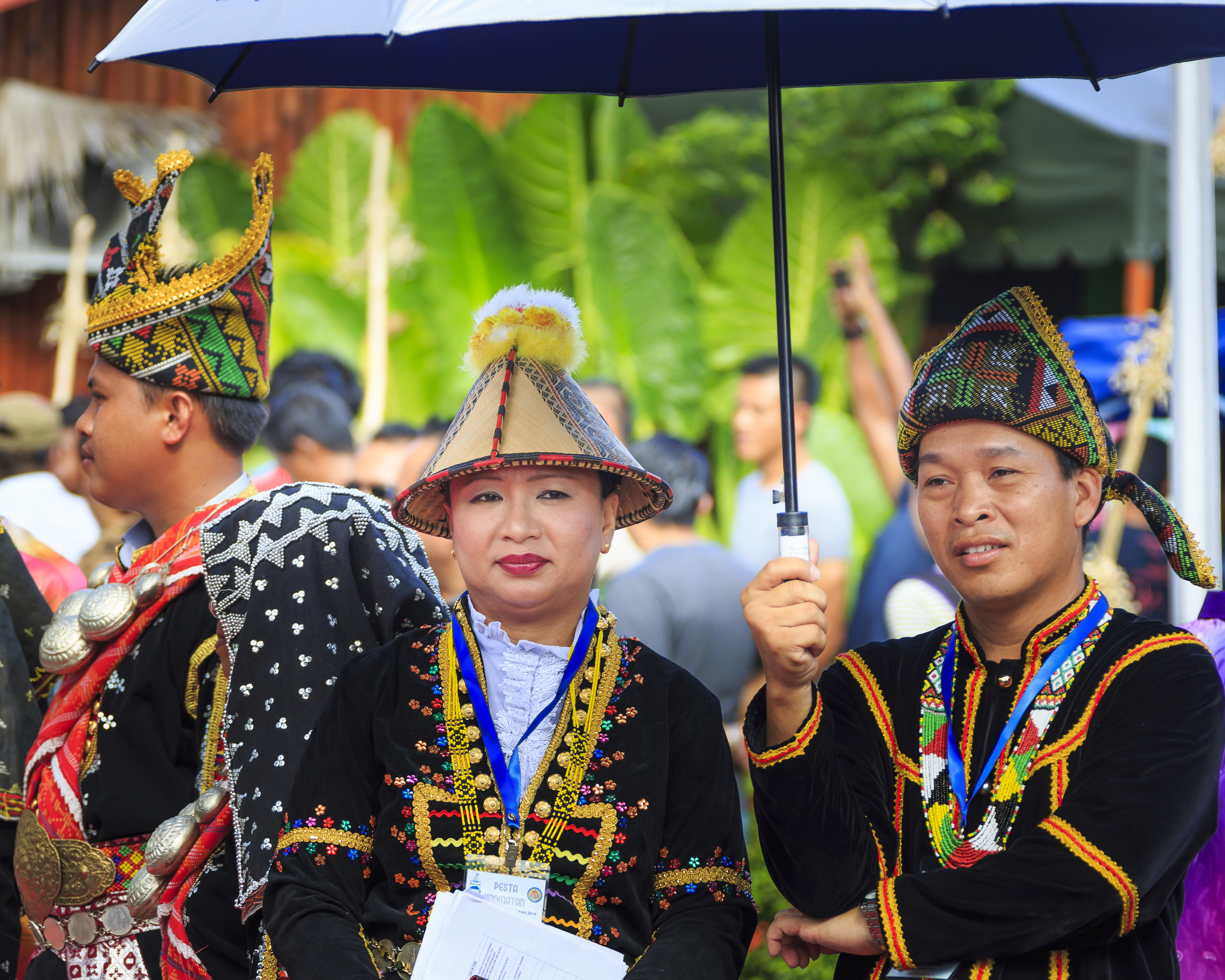
Conical hats (Siyung) of the Kadazan people of Sabah.

=== Bumiputera ===
==== Malay ====
Traditional Malay clothing for men is the Baju Melayu, a long-sleeved shirt which is worn over trousers and usually accompanied with a short sarong called a samping which is wrapped around the hips. It is also often accompanied with a songkok or tengkolok. Traditionally, Malay men may opt to wear the Pending and Baju Sikap in order to complete the Malay "suit six".

On the other hand, Malay women wear the Baju Kurung. Baju Kurung is a knee-length blouse worn over a long skirt, known as sarong. The blouse is long-sleeved and usually collarless, while the sarong has pleats on one side. A tudong, selendang or kain dagang is sometimes worn with this. Another popular traditional costume for women is the Baju Kebaya, a more tight-fitting two-piece dress that is often considered less formal. It is famously worn by the female flight attendants of Malaysia Airlines.

==== Peranakan ====
Chinese immigrants who married Malays and adopted some of the Malay cultures are known as the Baba Nyonya or Peranakan Chinese. The traditional wear for Nyonya is the Baju Panjang and a style of kebaya known as Kebaya Nyonya, which are hard-made lace-like trimmed clothing, often with intricate embroidery. On the other hand, the Baba usually wear clothing similar to the Chinese, called Baju Lok Chuan.

Similar to Peranakan, the Chitty community commonly found in Malacca usually wear similar costumes. The Chitty women usually wear the Kebaya Panjang or the Kebaya Pendek with a sarong while the men wear dhoti with shirt or sarong with a head turban.

Those descended from the Portuguese often wear Portuguese-style outfits. Men often wear jackets and trousers with waist sashes, while women wear broad front-layered skirts. The dominant colours are black and red.

==== Other indigenous ====
Most indigenous people wore bark costumes decorated with beads. The Orang Asli of West Malaysia still wear clothing of natural materials, often out of tree bark and skirt. Leaf fronds are sometimes crafted into headbands called tempok or other ornaments. On the other hand, in the Siamese community of northern Malaysia, both women and men have traditionally worn attire of Thai origin.

In East Malaysia similar clothes are worn. The Orang Ulu of Sarawak wear hand-loomed cloths as well as tree bark fabrics. Beads and feathers are used for decoration. On the other hand, the Iban are known for their woven pua used in the traditional Ngepan costumes. In Sabah, the clothing of different tribes differs with different amounts, with tribes in close proximity having similar clothing. Notable ones are the Kadazan-Dusun bamboo strips hat called siung worn by women, the dastar of the Bajau worn by men.

=== Non-Bumiputera ===
==== Chinese ====
Traditional, Chinese men in Malaysia wear a dress called a Tang suit. A Tang suit is a type of jacket with a collar and a knot at the belly. It is mostly decorated with floral motifs. On the other hand, Chinese women wear the cheongsam, a one-piece dress with a collar, diagonally closed with small clips or toggles (fabric clasps). It sometimes can have slits at the side, as is made with a soft fabric such as silk. The cheongsam is especially popular around the time of Chinese New Year and other formal gatherings. Older well-respected women wear a samfoo, which looks like pajamas with a separate loose-fitting top fastened by toggles and ankle-length, or above the ankle, pants.

==== Indian ====
Indians in Malaysia as with elsewhere in the world wear sarees, which are usually worn with a petticoat of a similar shade. It is wrapped around the body so that the embroidered end hangs over the shoulder, while the petticoat is worn above the bellybutton to support the saree, which can be made from a wide variety of materials.

On formal occasions, Indian men wear the kurta, a knee-length collarless shirt that is adorned in mostly white or pastel colors. Nowadays, kurtas are also made out of colorful fabrics and worn with a loose trouser with a string tie at the waist called the pyjama. Indian men also wear Sherwani, Lungi and Dhoti.

The Punjabi Salwar kameez, a long tunic worn over trousers with a matching shawl is also popular among Punjabis. The fabrics are imported from India, made of the best quality silk that is used in making sarees. On the other hand, the men wear Kurta with pants and a mandatory head turban.

== Gallery ==
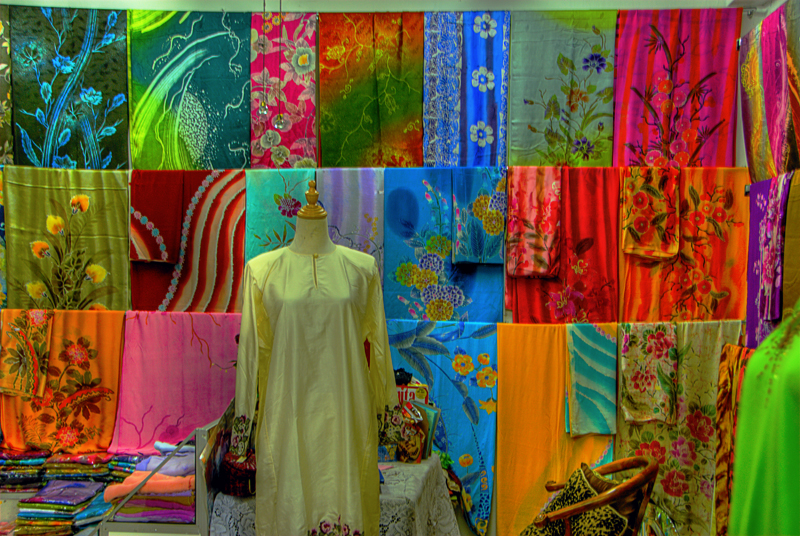
A shop in Malaysia selling a variety of Malaysian batik.

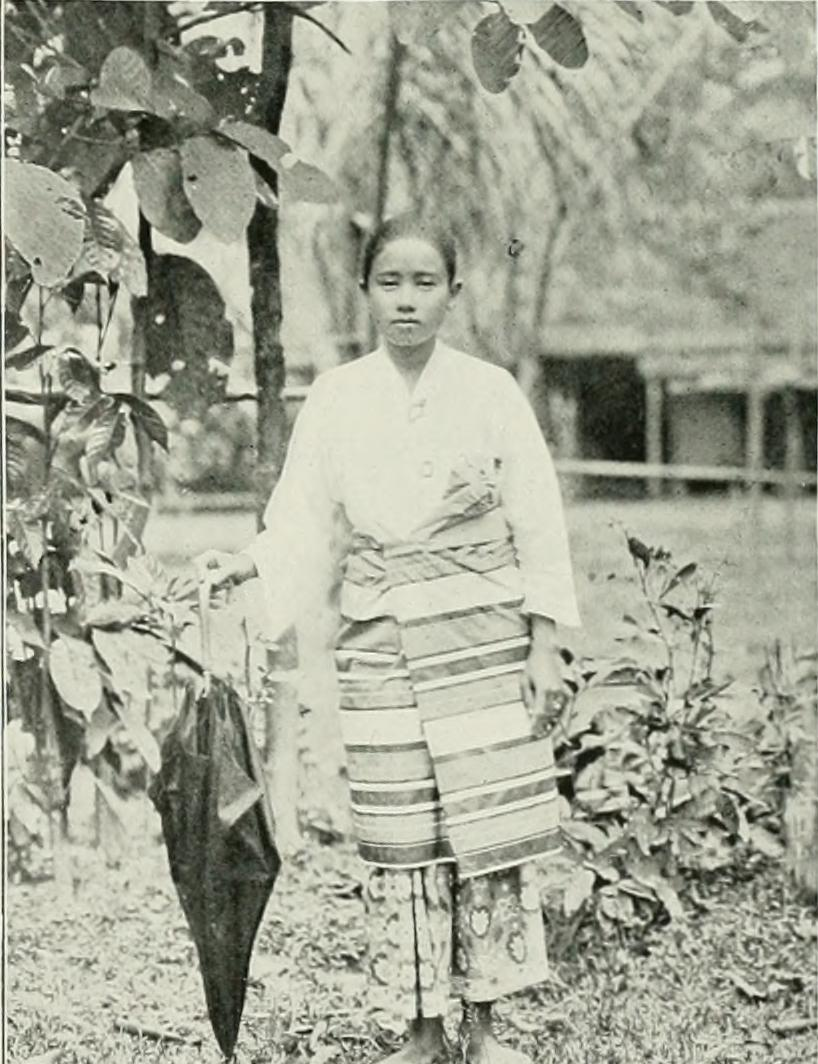
A Terengganuan Malay woman in traditional Malay Baju Kebaya, 1908.

Tani Yutaka, the Malayan Japanese secret agent, photographed in Baju Melayu.

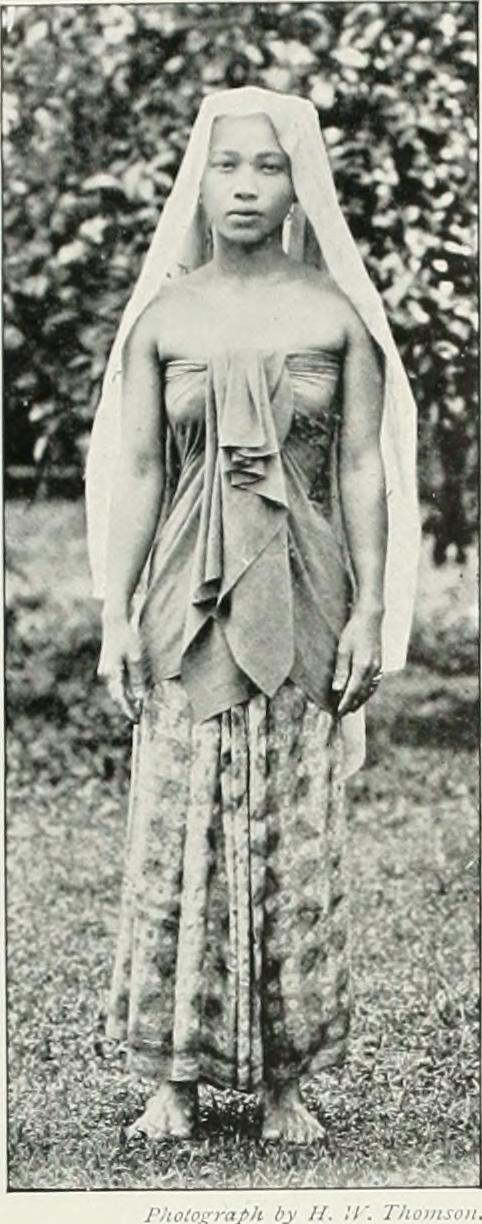
A kain lepas with a broad sash (kain kemban) dressed over a Terengganuan style of flowered sarong with kain kelubung.

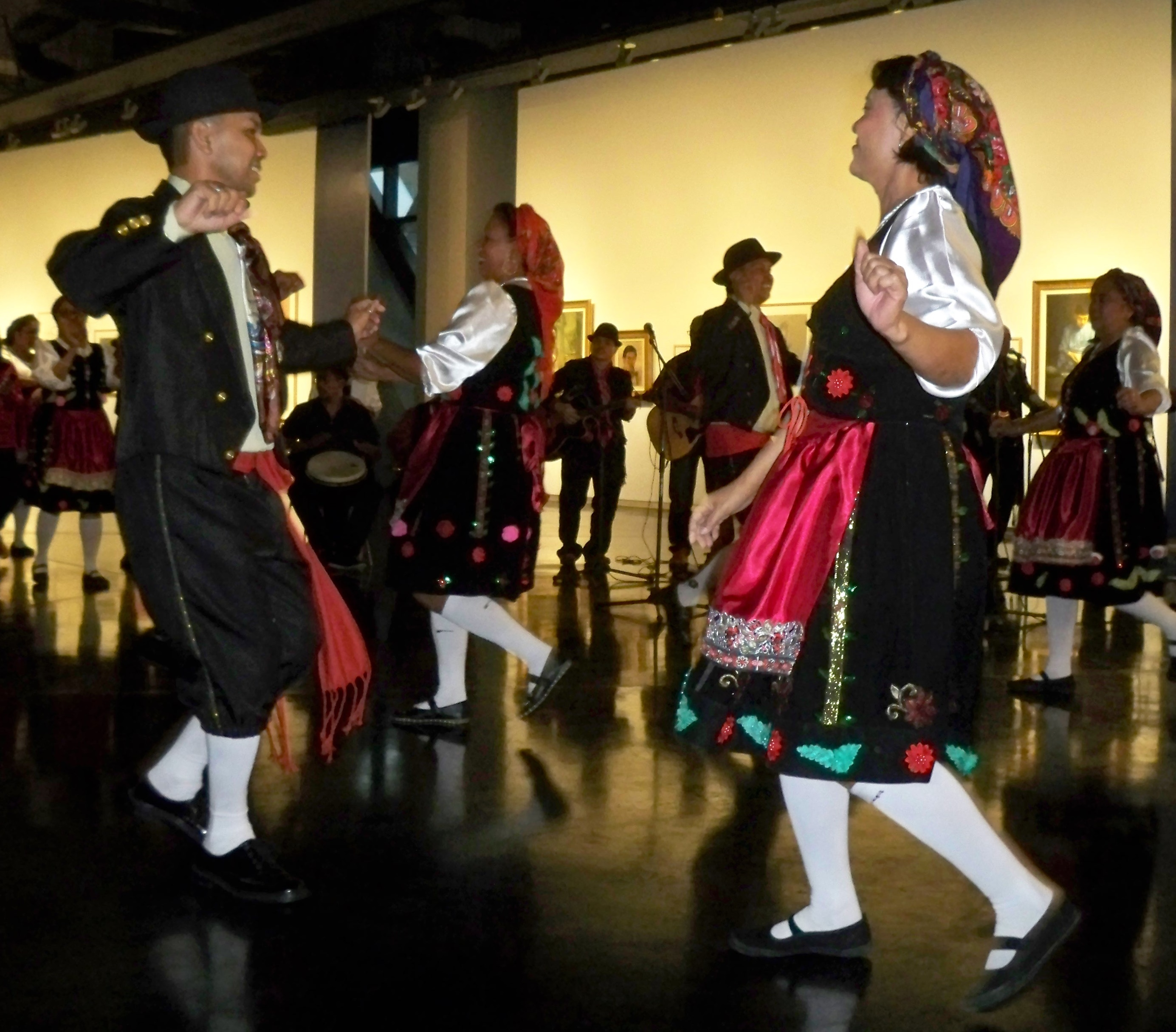
A group of Kristang people performing a traditional dance in Malacca.

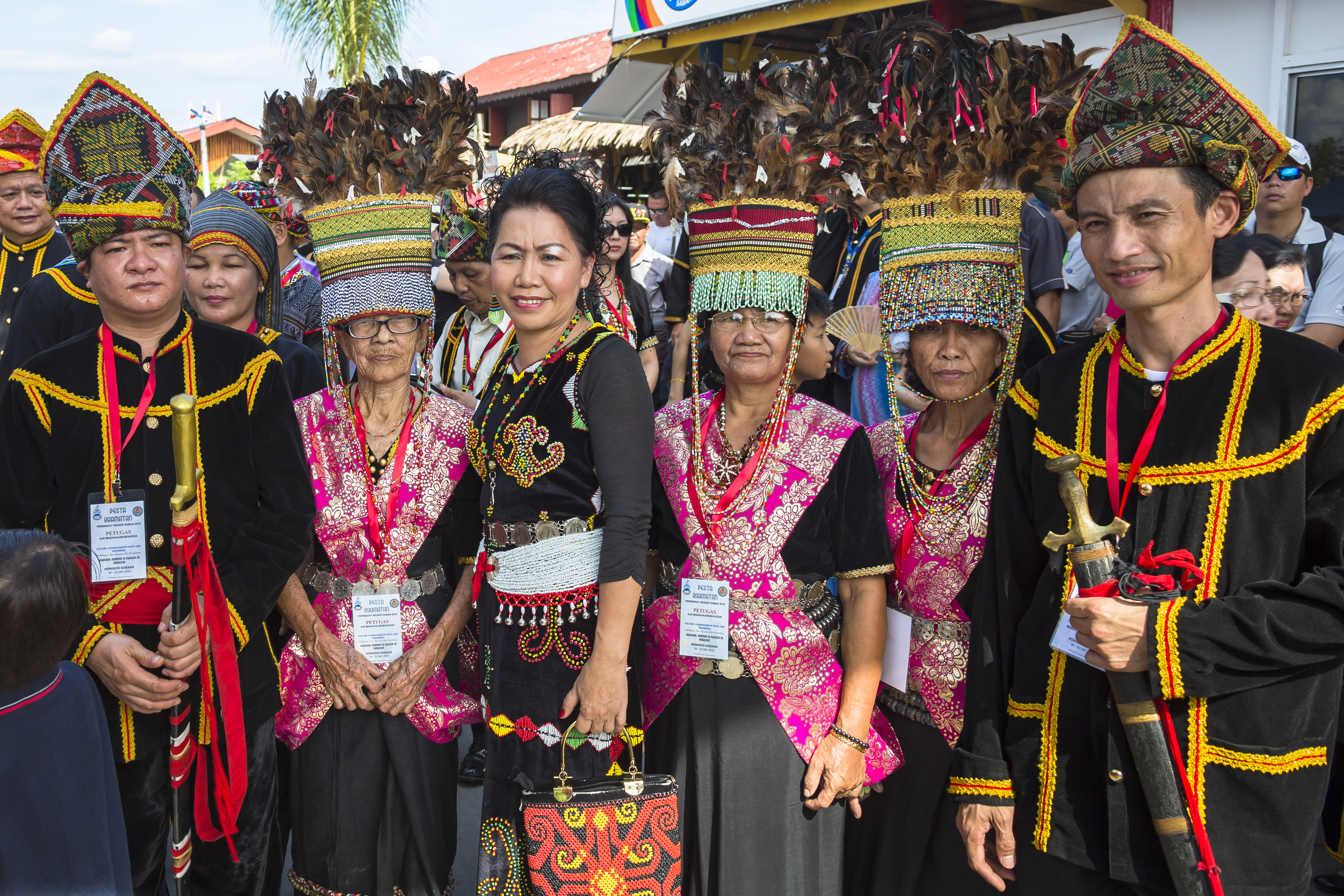
Variety of Kadazandusun priest and priestesses attires.

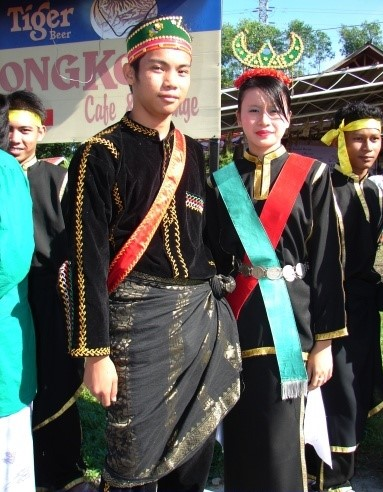
Bisaya traditional costume in Sabah

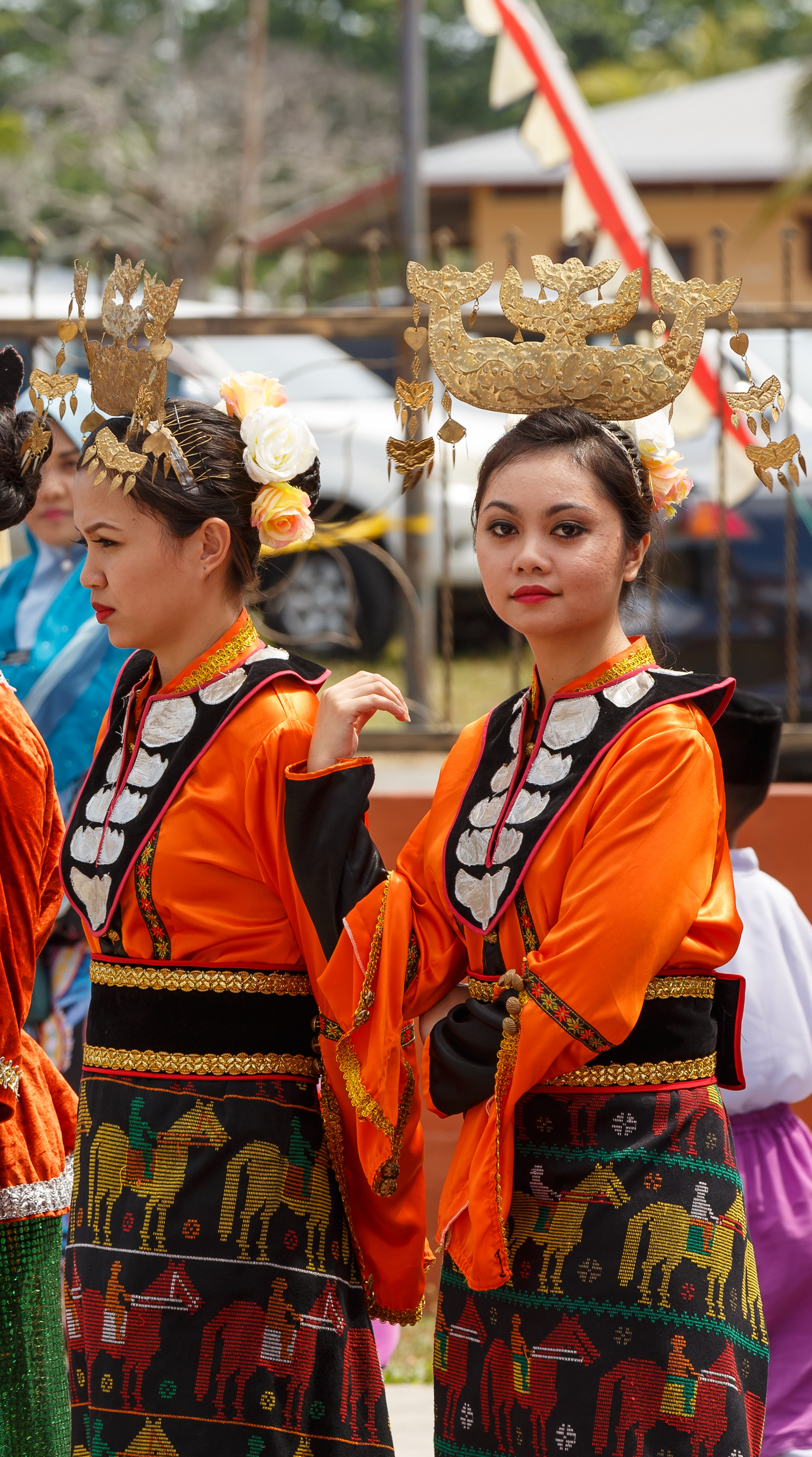
West Coast Bajau women of Sabah, in their Badu Sipak.

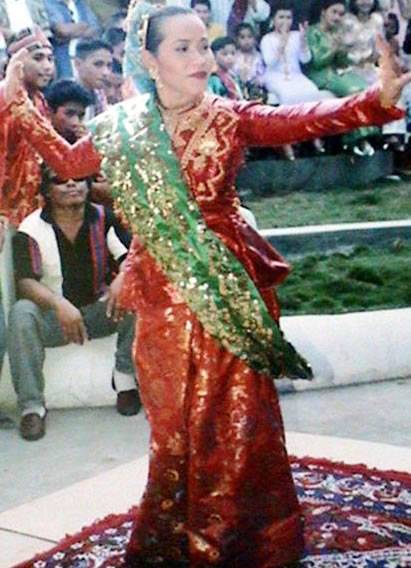
Suluk woman in a pangalay dance.

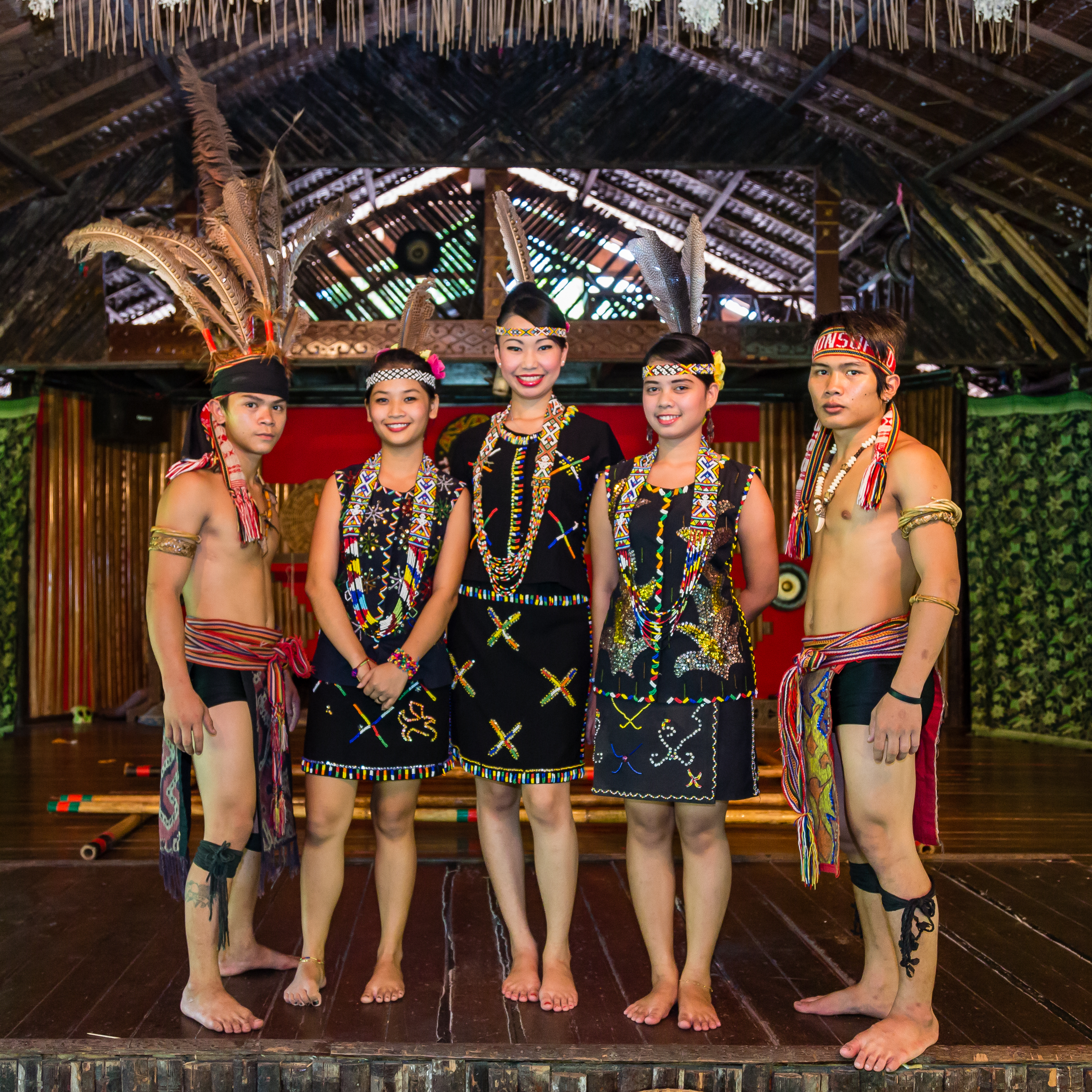
Murut in traditional attire.

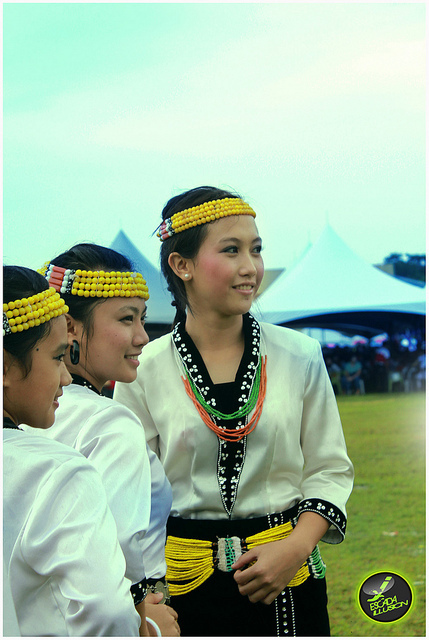
Lundayeh women from Sabah in traditional attire.

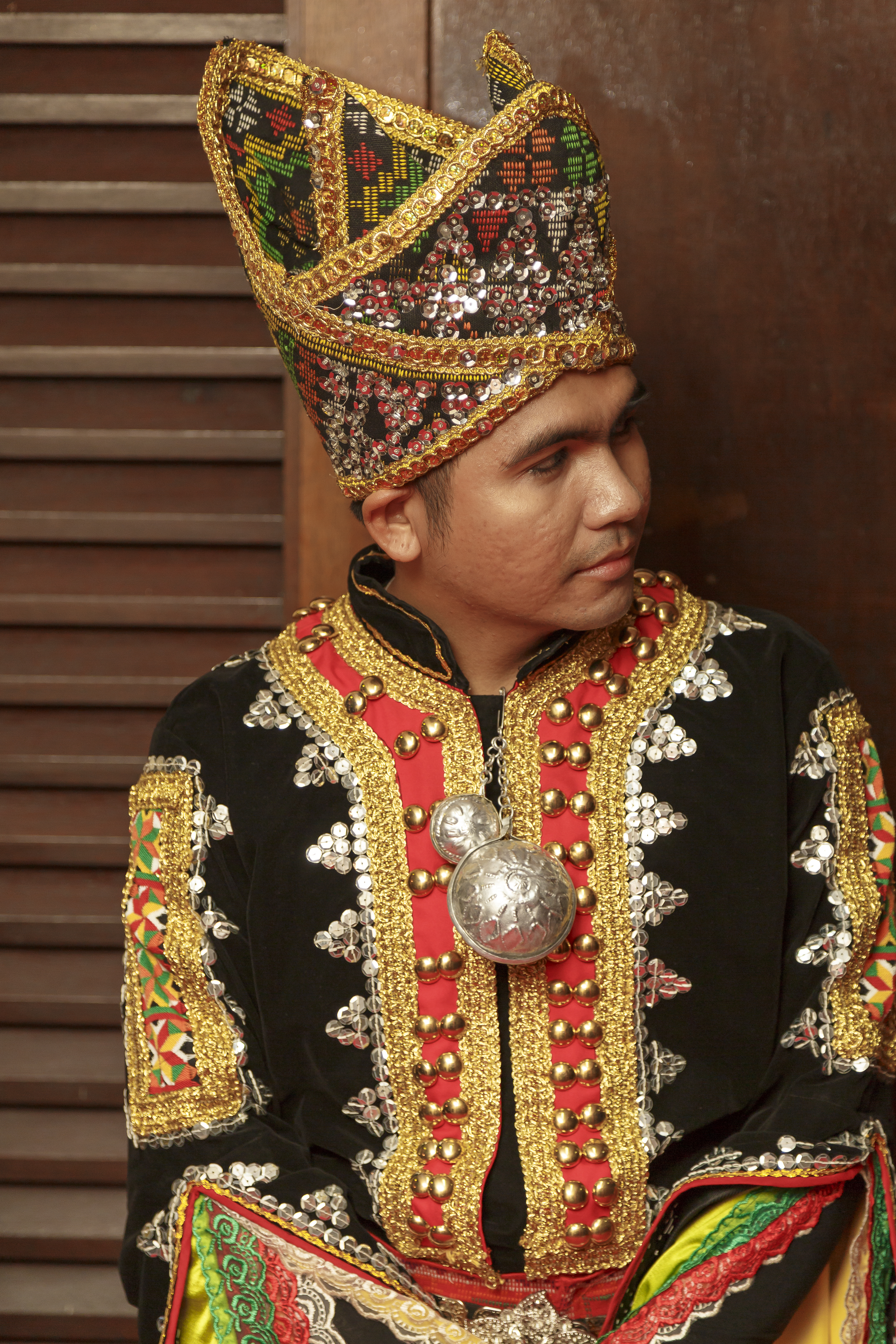
Dusun traditional costume

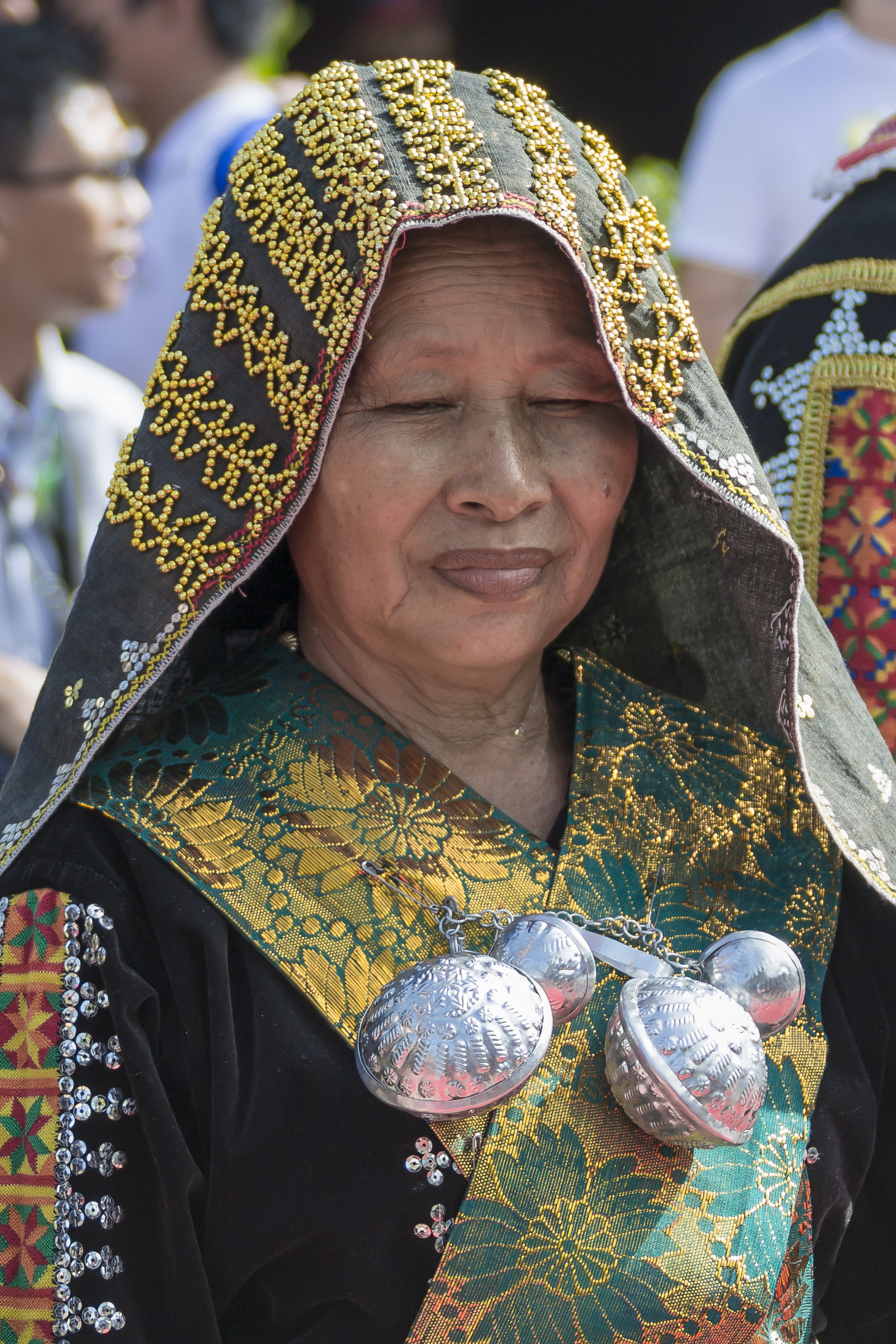
Dusun women with Sunduk

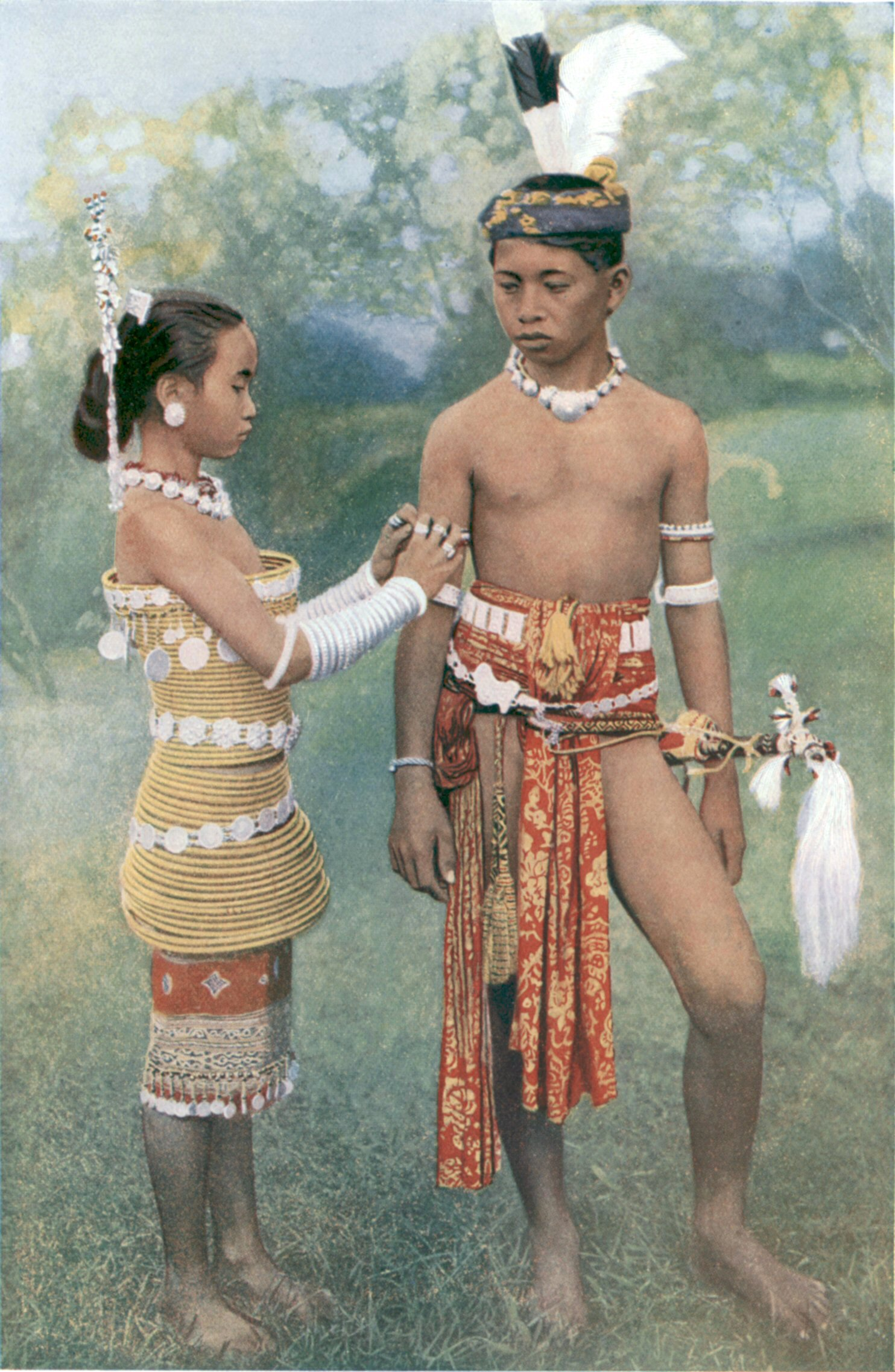
An Iban couple in their ngepan.

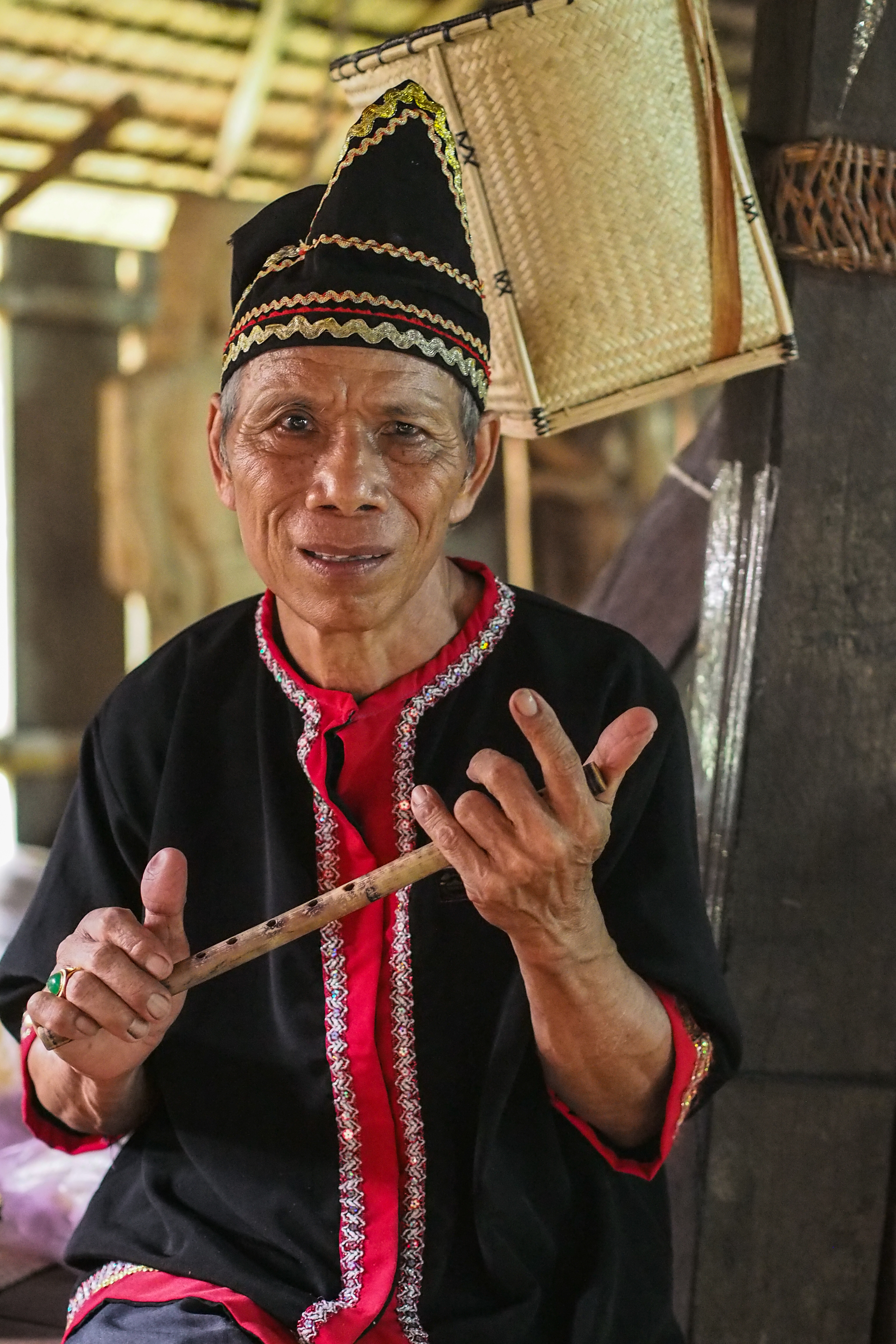
A Bidayuh man with a flute from Sarawak.

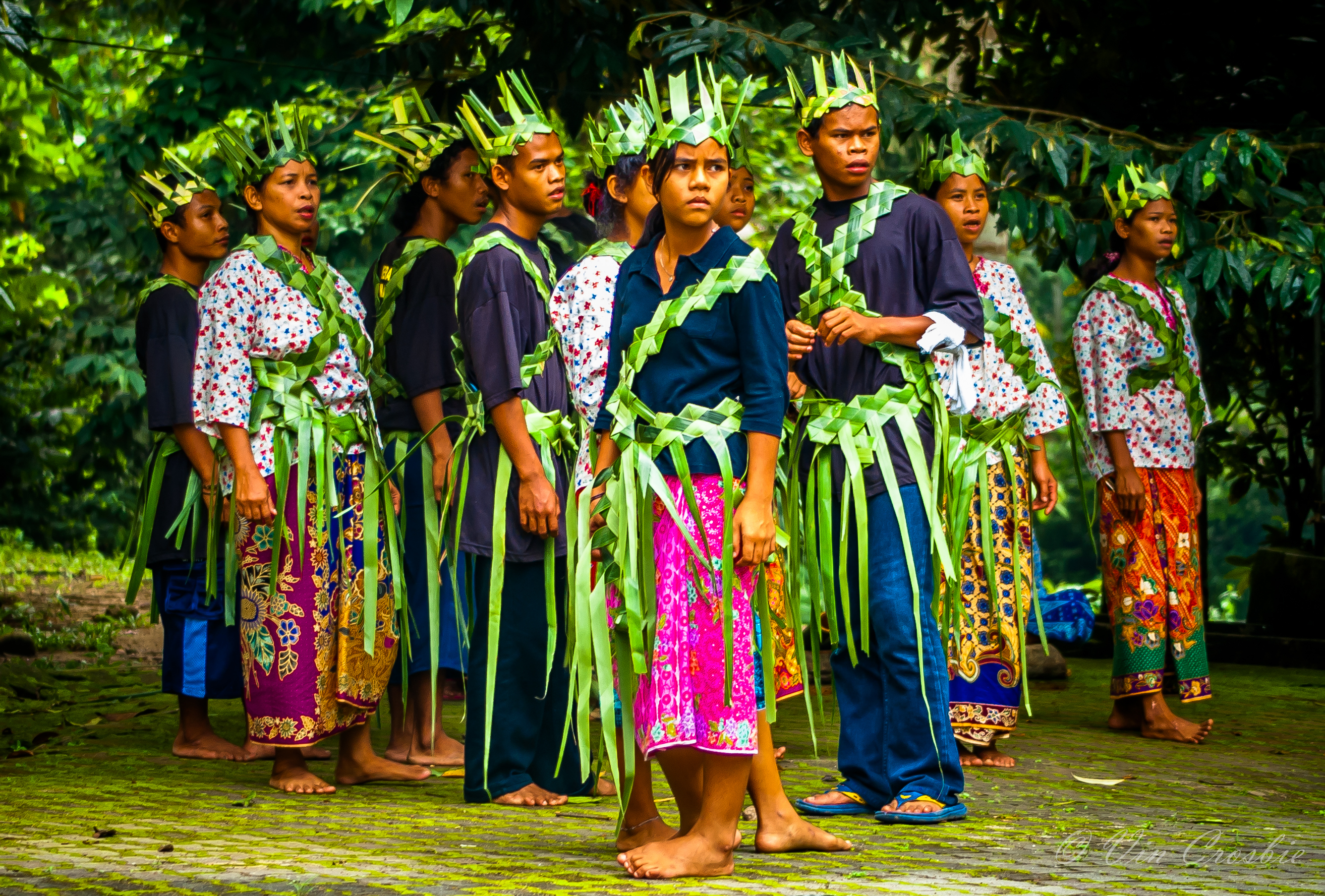
Jah Hut performers in Selangor.

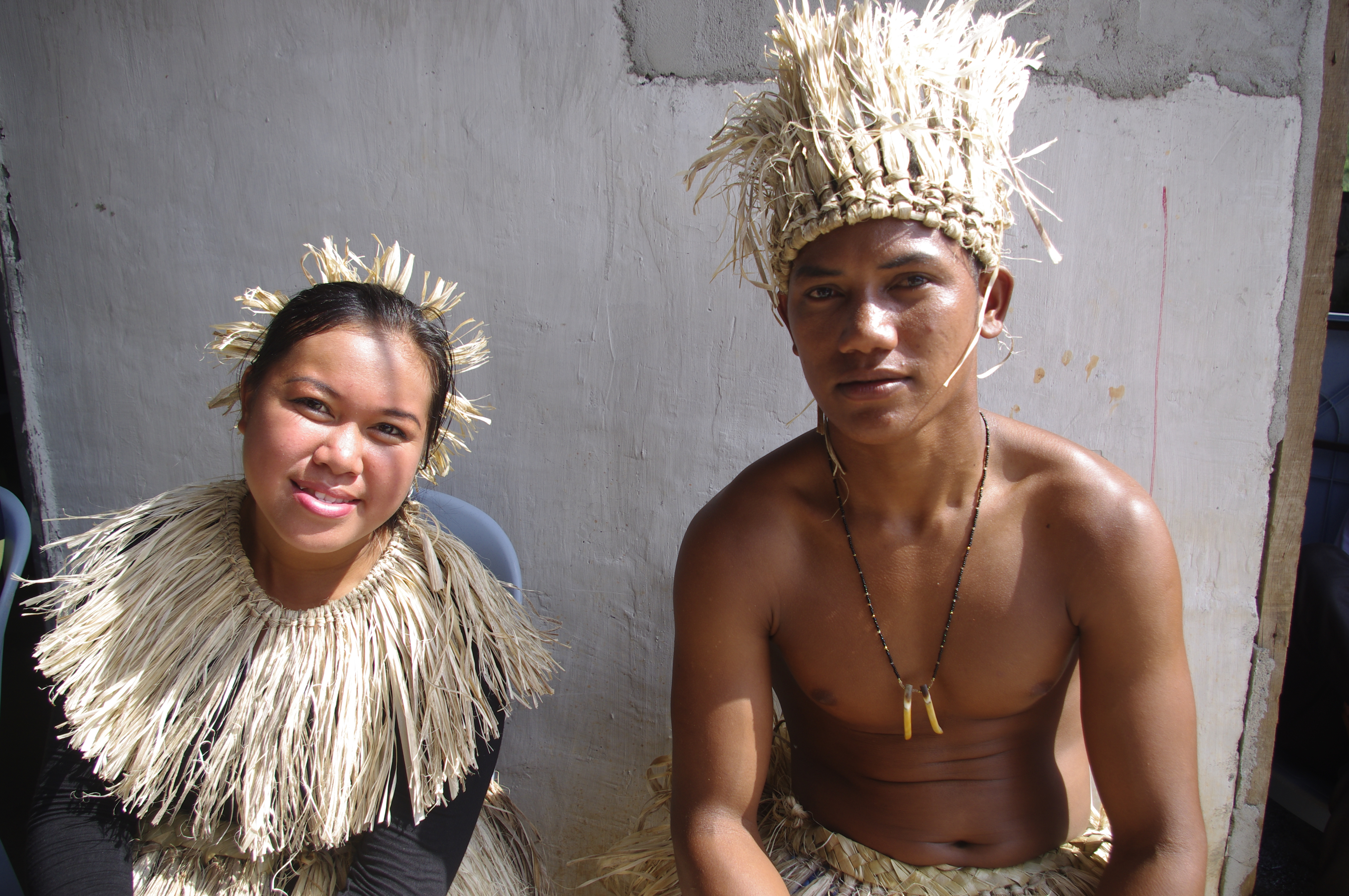
An Orang Seletar man and woman from Pasir Gudang, Johor in traditional attire.

== See also ==
- Culture of Malaysia
