= Samping =

Malay traditional clothing

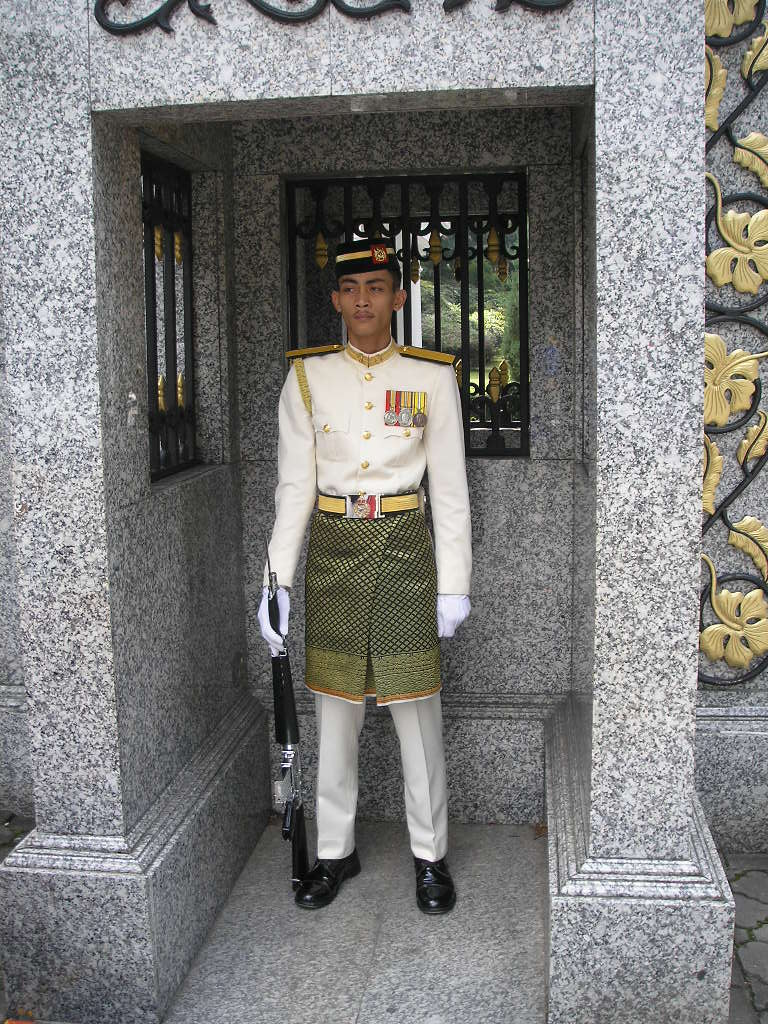
A Malaysian royal guard combining samping with full military dress

Samping or Kain Dagang (Jawi: سمڤيڠ) is a traditional Malay costume originated from the court of Malacca, and is traditionally worn by men and women in Brunei, Malaysia, Indonesia, Singapore and southern Thailand. This type of traditional costume is a part of the national dress of Brunei and Malaysia.

== Etymology ==
Samping or Kain Dagang is loosely translated as "side" or "merchant cloth" as it is worn mostly during formal occasions. It is a kind of short sarong worn after wearing Baju Kurung or Baju Melayu (in Malay costume) and usually from the waist to the knees only. It is usually made of songket, tenun, or sarong fabric.

== Styles ==
Samping wear styles vary by state. For example, the style of Berdagang Dalam is very popular in the Malaysian state of Johor. It is usually worn with a style of Baju Melayu called Teluk Belanga. For other states in Malaysia, particularly on the west coast of the Malay peninsula, the style of Berdagang Luar is the most prominent, and usually worn with a style of Baju Melayu called Cekak Musang. For women, instead of wearing samping, it is usually held by the left hand and can be used as a veil when outdoor to protect oneself from the scorching sun.

The way in which Samping was worn in ancient times played a role in showing the difference in one's rank in society. At that time, only the royal family could wear the Samping with the Berdagang Luar style. However now, everyone is free to choose how to wear a samping according to their tastes. When indoor, it can be tied at the waist or hung on the arm.

The style of samping can be divided into three according to one's rank in society namely:

- Ikatan Pancung (kings, sultans, and princes)
- Ikatan Kembung (Malay nobleman)
- Ikatan Lingkup (common people)

== See also ==
- Malaysian cultural outfits
- Culture of Malaysia
