= Central Band of the Royal Malay Regiment =

Regimental military band in the Malaysian Army

- Pancaragam Pusat Rejimen Melayu Diraja
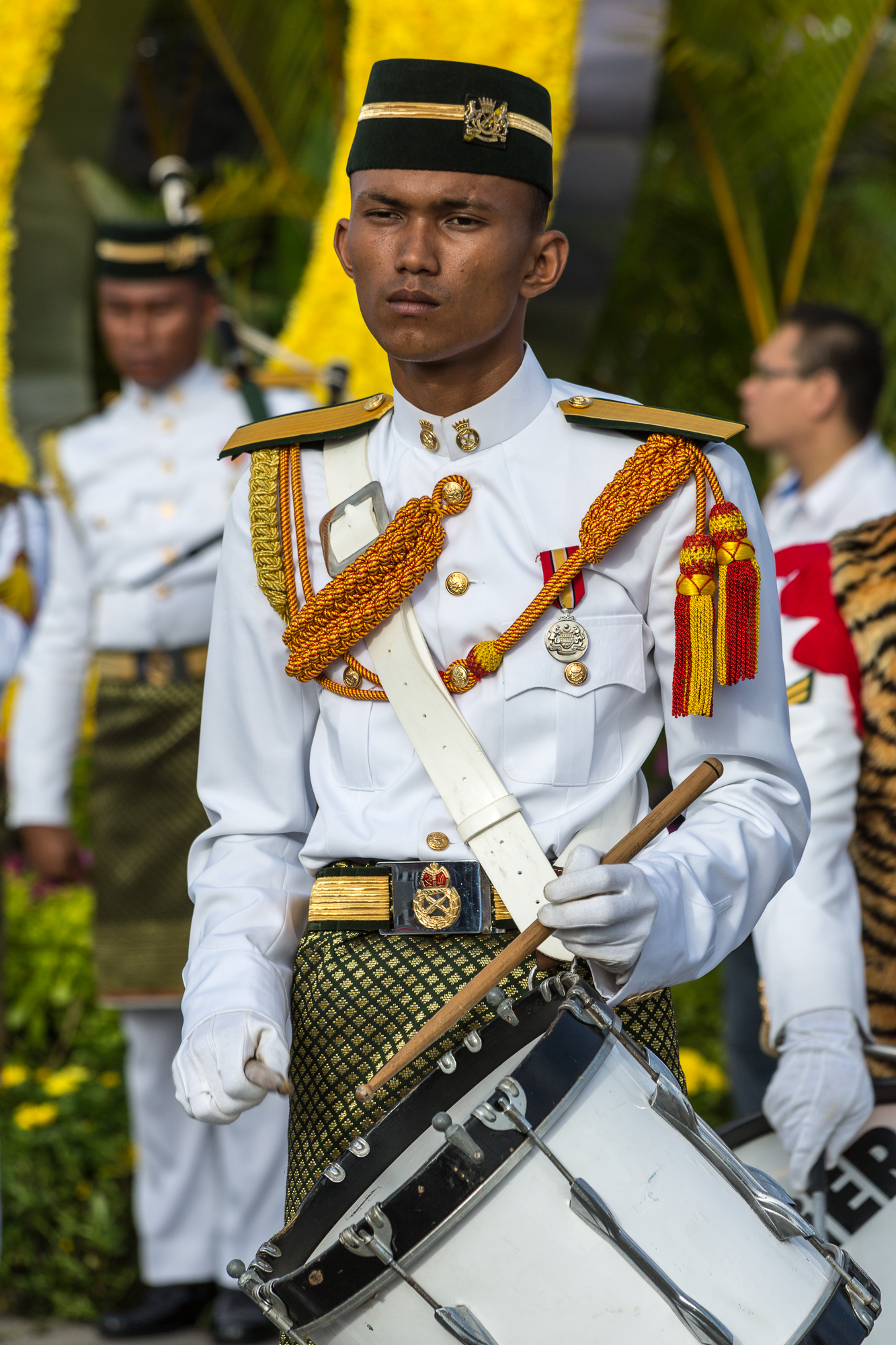
- A drummer of the band during the Hari Merdeka celebrations in Sabah.
- Country: Malaysia
- Branch: Malaysian Army
- Type: Military band
- Part of: Royal Malay Regiment
- Garrison/HQ: Kuala Lumpur
- Anniversaries: November 23

Commanders
- Notable commanders: Captain Edgar Lenthall; Major Muhammad Nor Azizan Yaha

Insignia
- Acronym: PPRAMD

The Central Band of the Royal Malay Regiment (Malay: Pancaragam Pusat Rejimen Melayu Diraja, PPRAMD) is the official central band of the Malaysian Army's Royal Malay Regiment that is dedicated to providing ceremonial honours and music to the Yang di-Pertuan Agong, the Prime Minister, the Chief Justice, the President of the Senate, and the Speaker of the House of Representatives. It is the Army's seniormost band. It is considered the equivalent to the 5 regimental bands of the Foot Guards.

== Characteristics ==
As a Commonwealth member, Malaysia sports military bands that are very similar to the British as well as other commonwealth countries. This is especially true in the case of the Band of the Royal Malay Regiment, which fields their percussion section (specifically snare drums) at the front similar to the Royal Marines. It is also of the few commonwealth military bands that use sousaphones when on parade, with others including New Zealand, Singapore and Fiji.

== Obligations ==
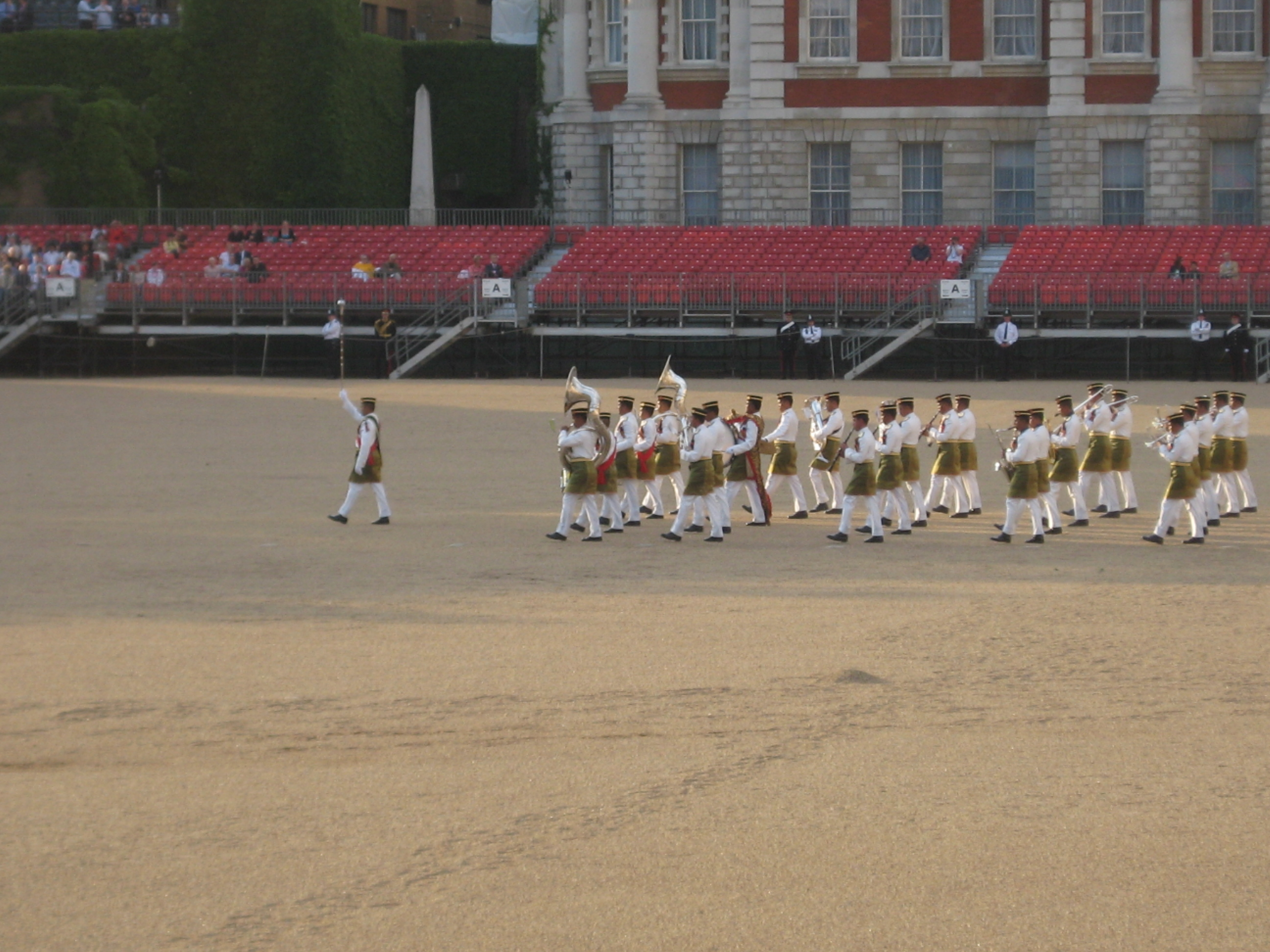
The combined band on Horse Guards Parade.

Among their obligations are the following:

- Maintain a musical presence at military parades
- Honoring foreign heads of state on their state visits to Federal Territory of Kuala Lumpur
- Support the everyday ceremonial activities of the Regiment
- Support the all ceremonial activities of the state
- Performing drill at military tattoos domestically and internationally

In 2008, the PPRAMD was invited to perform in the United Kingdom, performing at Royal Tattoo at Windsor Castle, at the Household Division Beating Retreat on Horse Guards Parade, and the mounting of the Queen's Guard at Buckingham Palace. Domestically, the PPRAMD was responsible for according state visits for foreign leaders, such as King Salman, President Emmanuel Macron, and President Barack Obama. During all of the arrival honors for the mentioned leaders, Menjunjung Duli was played by the PPRAMD during the inspection of the guard of honour. In supporting all events of national importance, the PPRAMD is always seen at high level occasions, such as the Installation of the Yang di-Pertuan Agong and the Opening of Parliament.

== Organization ==
- Unit HQ
- Marching Band
- Brass fanfare section
- Corps of Drums
- Symphonic Band
- Pipe band
- Big band

=== Pipes and Drums ===
The Pipes and Drums of the Central Band are made up of personnel who belong to the Malacca-based 5th Battalion, RMR and is platoon-sized. It was founded in 1953 when an officer of the King's Own Scottish Borderers (an affiliated British Regiment) was seconded to form a pipe platoon. The officer, who was in fact Scottish himself, introduced the ethnically Malay members of the regiment to bagpipe training. At present, the pipes and drums of the current Royal Regiment of Scotland and the RMR have maintained their historical alliance alongside the larger regiment. The platoon has done many events, being invited to the Edinburgh Festival many times, with the last time being in January 1990, on the occasion of the KOSB's 300th regimental anniversary.
