= Kebaya =

Southeast Asian traditional clothing

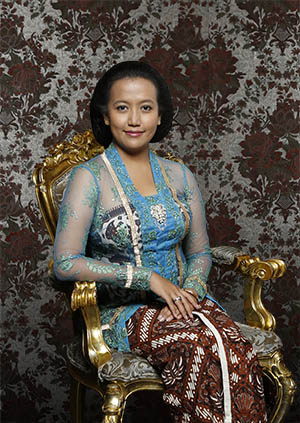
- Javanese kebaya is a sheer blouse worn over batik kemben, as shown here worn by Princess Hayu of Yogyakarta.
- Type: Traditional upper garment
- Place of origin: Maritime Southeast Asia (Majapahit (modern-day Java, Indonesia) or Malacca (modern-day Malaysia))
- Manufacturer: Indonesians (inc. Javanese) and Malay

Kebaya: knowledge, skills, traditions and practices
- UNESCO Intangible Cultural Heritage
- Country: Brunei, Indonesia, Malaysia, Singapore, and Thailand
- Reference: 02090
- Region: Asia and the Pacific

Inscription history
- Inscription: 2024 (19th session)
- List: Representative

A kebaya (Note: Dutch and older Indonesian orthography: kebaja; Javanese: ꦏꦼꦧꦪ; Jawi: کباي; Pegon: كٓبَايَا) is an upper garment traditionally worn by women in Southeast Asia, notably in Brunei, Indonesia, Malaysia, Singapore, and Southern Thailand.

Kebaya is an upper garment opened at the front that is traditionally made from lightweight fabrics such as brocade, cotton, gauze, lace, or voile and sometimes adorned with embroidery. The front is secured with either buttons, pins, or brooches. The lower garment for the outfit is known as sarong, kemben or kain, a long piece of cloth wrapped and tucked around the waist or under the armpits, either made out of batik, ikat, songket or tenun. (Note: Tenun means woven fabrics, this includes tenun Bugis, tenun lurik and tenun Pahang)

Kebaya has become a Southeast Asian fashion icon, with many Southeast Asian flag carrier airlines, including Singapore Airlines, Malaysia Airlines, Royal Brunei Airlines, and Garuda Indonesia adopting the traditional clothing as the uniforms for their female flight attendants.

== Etymology ==
The link between "kebaya" with "qaba" "a vesture", an Arabic term was first established in the Hobson-Jobson dictionary in 1886. The term was used since the seventh century and was ultimately originated from a Persian word meaning "robe of honour". Portuguese records published in the 16th and 17th century also noted variations of the term cabaya (Note: Variations of the term cabaya includes caba, cabai, cabaia, cabaai, cabay and cabaye) as a Muslim long robe. The term was then introduced to the Malay world and Java through a Portuguese intermediary during the 16th century.

According to the Kamus Dewan, a kebaya is defined as a women's long-sleeved dress opened at the front, secured with buttons, pins, or brooches while the Kamus Besar Bahasa Indonesia described it as a women's long-sleeved upper garment worn with a long piece of cloth. Although the etymology of kebaya has its origin as a dress worn by both men and women, the modern definition of kebaya in both languages has been narrowed to only refer to the women's dress.

== History ==
=== Background ===
==== From the Middle East ====
There are extensive possibilities of the origin of kebaya with most indicating its roots in the Middle East. The connection between kebaya with Arabic qaba, "a long loose jacket" was first established by orientalist scholars Henry Yule and Arthur Burnell in 1886. Arabic clothing was known since the seventh century, with historical records even mentioning that the Islamic Prophet Muhammad received gifts of aqbiya (plural of qaba) on several occasions. Scholars attributed that Persian is the ultimate origin of qaba. With the spread of Islam, the term and clothing was not only known in Arabic but also Persian, Turkish and Urdu. Due to its resemblance, many sources stated that kebaya has its origin from Muslim clothing, namely qaba, habaya, al akibiya al turkiyya and djubba. The claim that kebaya may have its origins from the Arab World is highly possible as Islam was firmly established in the Malay world in the 15th century when women began to cover up in reaction to the Islamic dress code. Before Islam, local women dressed with fewer layers because of the hot and humid climate and the pre-Islamic religion of the Malays did not impose such restrictions. The Malaccan-Portuguese explorer, Manuel Godinho de Erédia, suggests that the wearing of cabayas (plural of cabaya) were brought to Southeast Asia by Arab and Egyptian merchants as early as 1618.

==== From the Indian Subcontinent and Portuguese ====
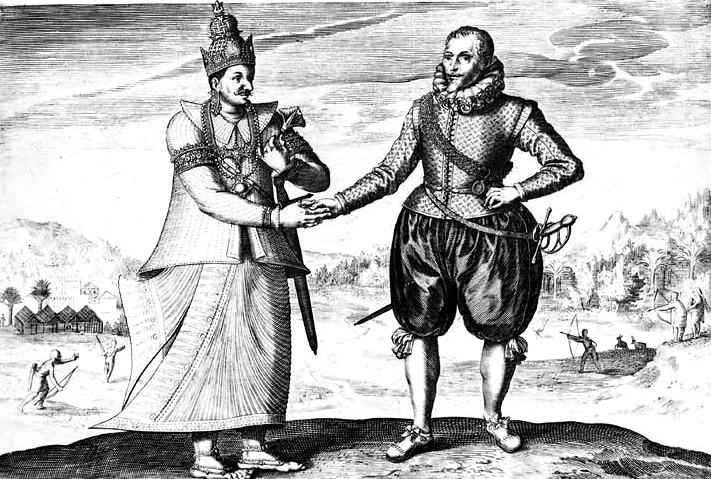
Vimaladharmasuriya and Spilbergen, 1602. Here shown cabaya as an upper body jacket.

The detailed description of cabaya can be seen in the 19th-century Hobson-Jobson dictionary. The Anglo-Indian dictionary describes cabaya as a word of Asian origin, referring to a surcoat or a long tunic of muslin worn by the Indian upper classes. The term was likely to be introduced into the subcontinent by the Portuguese. Several Portuguese records published in the 16th and 17th century also noted caba, cabaya and cabaia as a Muslim long robe worn by the ruling class of India as well as the Middle East. The earliest use of the word dates to the 1540s when the Portuguese explorer, Fernão Mendes Pinto visited India. It was also mentioned that the Prince Dharmapala of Kotte was the first to be introduced to the cabaya by the Portuguese, where it was worn by the Portuguese royalty during royal occasions. Later, King Vimaladharmasuriya of Kandy established it as the upper garment for Sri Lankan royalty signifying the changing of attitudes and loyalty to the Portuguese. Once Goa was occupied by the Portuguese in 1510, the Portuguese influences extended from the India Subcontinent to the Southeast Asia Archipelago. The term was then introduced to the archipelago to refer to a light cotton surcoat worn by both European men and women.

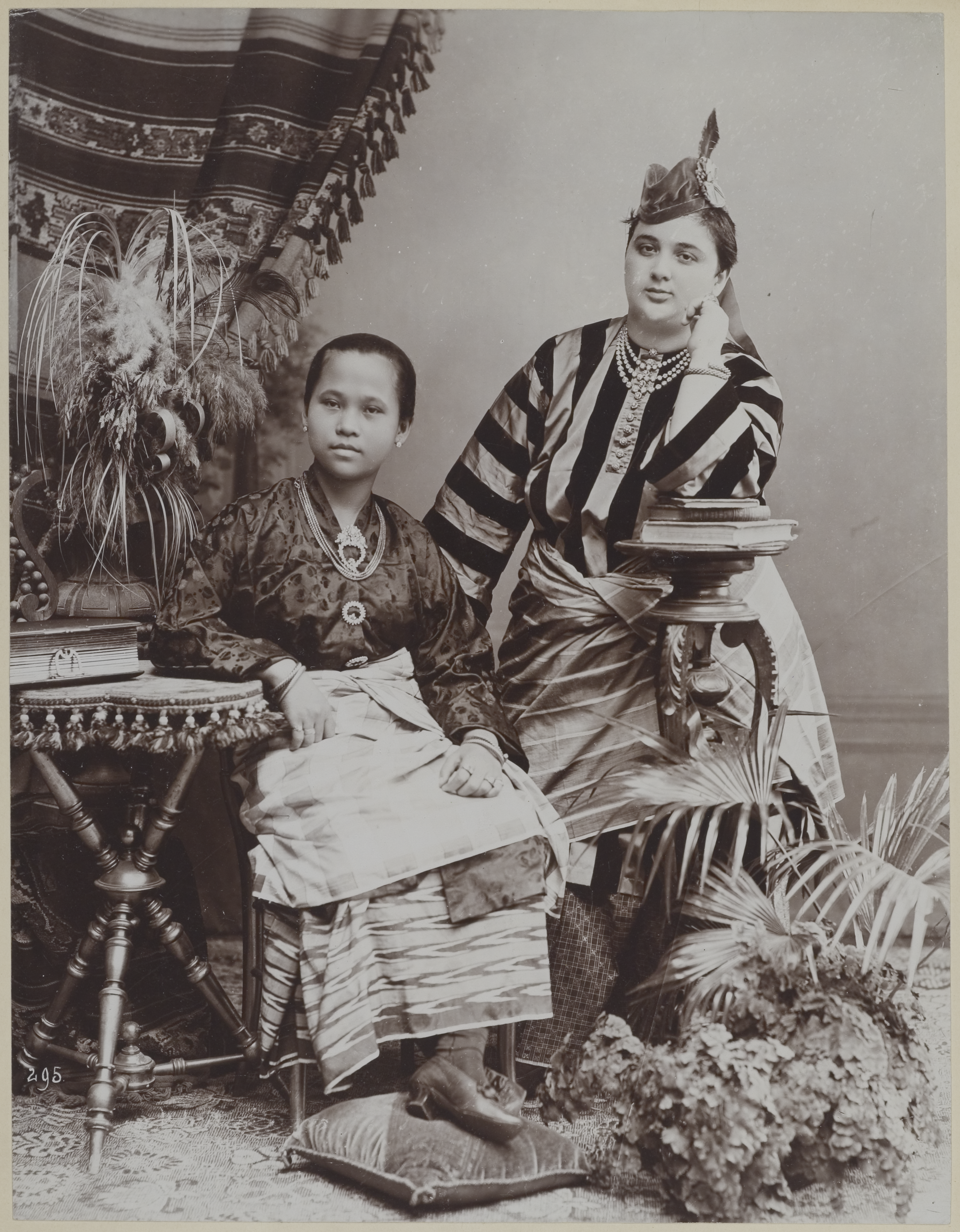
Sultana Khadijah of Johor and an unnamed lady. Here shown long kebaya was used alongside baju kurung by Malay royalties, circa 1900.

After the capture of Malacca in 1511, the cabaya worn by the Portuguese settlers in Portuguese Malacca (1511–1641) took the fancy of local Malay women, especially in Johor and the east coast of Malay Peninsula. It was popularized by the Chinese Peranakan in Malacca. This was perhaps encouraged by their Chinese husbands, as this style of clothing was considered appropriate and not that different from Chinese style clothing. Peter Mundy, a British writer who visited Goa in the 1630s, also stated that women in Malacca dressed similar to women in Goa. The influences of the Portuguese and Indian can be observed by the kebaya worn in Malacca, thus the possibilities that the term "cabaya" and the wearing of the dress was introduced to Malacca by the Portuguese or Portuguese Eurasians from India is higher than by the Arabs or Chinese.

==== From Malacca ====
Some sources also stated that kebaya is, in fact, a "Malay dress", predating the Portuguese arrival in the archipelago. Soon after the Portuguese captured Malacca (1400–1511), kebaya emerged as a favourite among Portuguese settlers, which led to the adoption of kebaya as one of their attire. Historical evidence also suggests that a substantial number of skilled craftsmen were brought by the Portuguese from Malacca to Cochin as early as Afonso de Albuquerque's return to Cochin and Goa in 1512. In Cochin, the kavaya thuni was introduced by Portuguese Malays and Portuguese Chinese from Malacca and Macau to local Portuguese Indians, many of whom were brought there as wives to the Portuguese settlers. Besides "kebaya", this style of clothing was also known by the Malays as "baju belah labuh besar" (long baggy dress) and by the Peranakans as "baju panjang" (long tunic). From Malacca, kebaya made its way to Java, likely to be brought by the Chinese and Portuguese Peranakans and by the 17th century, kebaya was worn by men and women across the Malay Archipelago, even in the Spice Islands further east.

==== From Java ====
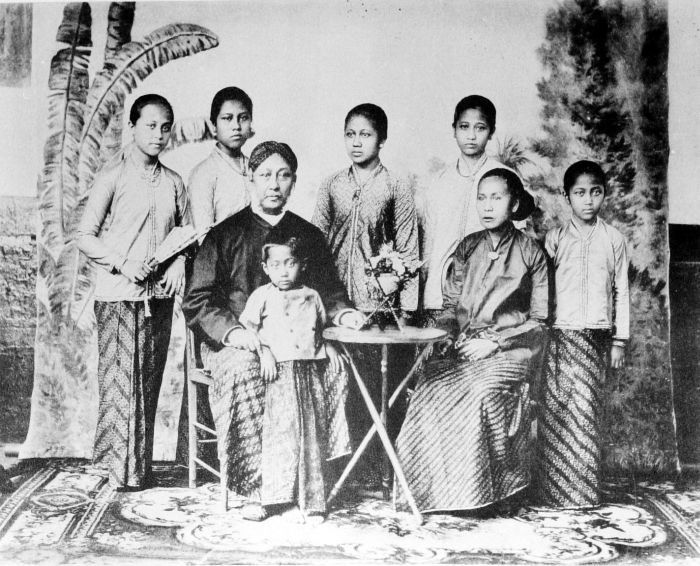
Young Kartini with her family. Here shown Javanese kebaya worn by women of Javanese aristocrats, circa 1890–1904.

Some resources also claimed that kebaya originated from Majapahit or Java, as a means to blend the existing kemben, women's torso wrap, to be more modest and acceptable as Islamic influence began to grow in coastal Javanese towns. The kebaya perhaps served to provide body coverage to court women and elites in reaction to Islamic strictures on modesty. When the Portuguese tried to assume the spice trade in Indonesia in the early 16th century, some women in Java already wore kebaya on their upper bodies. During this time in Java, kebaya was considered reserved clothing to be worn only by royalty and nobility. Majapahit was the first that formally adopted the kebaya, and subsequently it has become the official dress of its successors, Cirebon (1445–1926), Surakarta (1745–1946) and Yogyakarta. Nevertheless, the use of kebaya among peasant women in Java only became widespread in the late 18th century when it was encouraged by the Dutch.

==== From China ====
Southeast Asia has traded with China, India and the Middle East since the middle of the first millennium, which is possibly responsible for the introduction of this style of clothing into the archipelago. Foreign influences have been suggested, such as Chinese Ming tunic worn by the Chinese settlers between the 14th to 16th century, possibly led to the creation of kebaya in Java and Malacca. Concurrently, the emergence of kebaya as the traditional attire of the Javanese and Malays originated from the integration of the style of Chinese Ming, the Arab merchants and the Portuguese settlers. Thus, there are various styles of sarong kebaya throughout Southeast Asia, with each named after its famous wearer, place of origin or modification.

=== Development ===
==== Lace kebaya ====
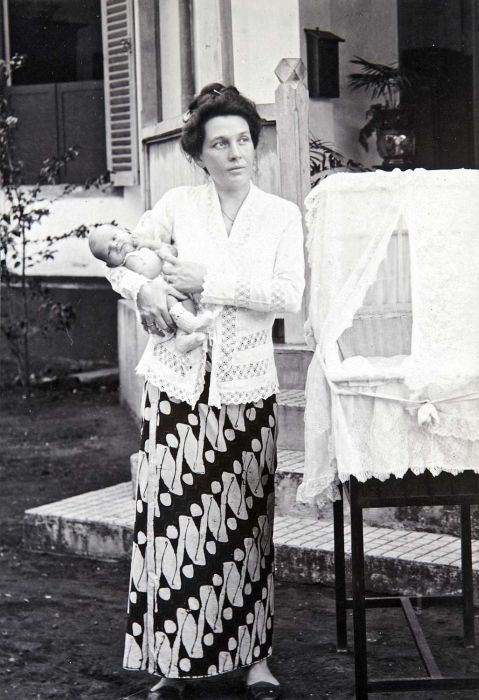
A Dutch woman in sarong kebaya, Dutch East Indies, 1920

In the 16th and 17th century, the craft of lacework came to Asia by way of Goa and became popular among the local people of coastal India, Sri Lanka, and Malacca. In Cocos Islands, the Cocos Malays modified the kebaya with European inspired elements especially the frill collar because textiles and clothes were brought by the Clunies-Ross family during the early 19th century. By the mid-19th century, wearing an outfit consisting of a white lace ornamented kebaya and a lavish batik sarong was regarded as a privilege of the European and Eurasian women in the Dutch East Indies. (Note: Malacca was also under the Dutch rule from 1641-1825)

In 1872, the Dutch administration issued a rule which required every resident of the colony to wear their ethnic clothing in public areas. The ordinance perhaps served as an effort to differentiate one individual from the others and identify someone of a specific ethnic group. From 1872 until 1920, kebaya had been adopted as the preferred women's attire of the Dutch East Indies, either worn by native women, European and Eurasians.

During this colonial period, the Dutch kebaya flourished in the Dutch East Indies, often using luxurious fabric embellished with imported white lace since it could block the tropics' hot air. On February 10, 1910, the colonial government issued a regulation for the Chinese Peranakan, an "equalization" that led the wealthy Peranakan women to wear kebaya and batik sarong similar to those of the Dutch and Indo women. Thus, the Peranakan women began to wear white lace kebaya, while the European and Eurasian women who used to prefer this style of kebaya started to shift to European clothing.

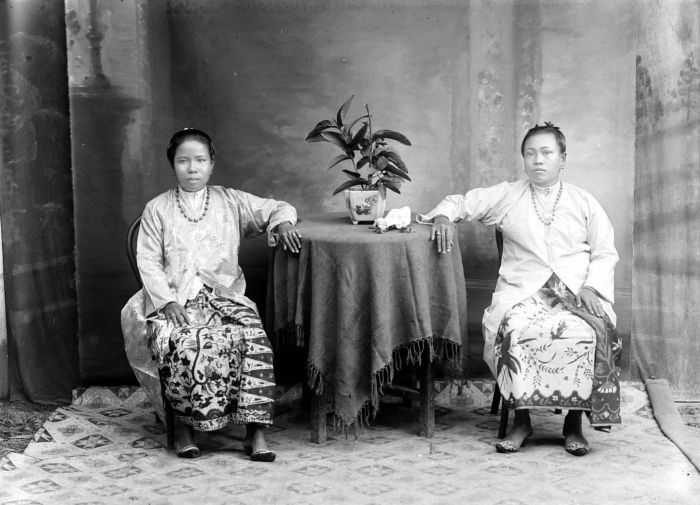
Two Peranakan women in long kebayas, Singkep, Riau Islands

By the early 20th century, the long kebaya (Note: Known as baju panjang, kebaya panjang, kebaya labuh or baju belah in Malaysia, Singapore and Indonesia. The terms "kebaya" and "baju" are used interchangeably) has evolved and the new "short kebaya", shaped and length above the hip emerged in various colonial centres, mainly in Java and the Straits Settlements. (Note: Straits Settlements consist of Penang, Malacca and Singapore) During this time, the long kebaya was seen as conservative and staid, worn only by the elderly women of the Peranakan community. As an option, the young Peranakans began to modify the form of a long kebaya and turned it into a short kebaya that the Europeans and Eurasians had adopted earlier. The Peranakans would often recycle the fabrics of their long kebayas into short kebayas.

The short kebaya worn by Peranakan is a tighter-fitting sheer blouse as opposed to the loose-fitting, knee-length tunic of its predecessor. The earliest example of a short kebaya worn by the community is the lace kebaya. (Note: Known as kebaya renda in Malaysia, Singapore and Indonesia. Renda is a Malay word borrowed from the Portuguese term for lace) This style is noted for the outstanding use of popular European lace to trim along the front opening hems and sleeves. Similar to a long kebaya, it has no buttons and needs to be fastened with pins or brooches. Even though lace kebaya has existed since at least the early 19th century, worn primarily by the Europeans and Eurasians, it was only a century later that the Peranakan women began to wear this type of kebaya.

==== Cutwork kebaya ====
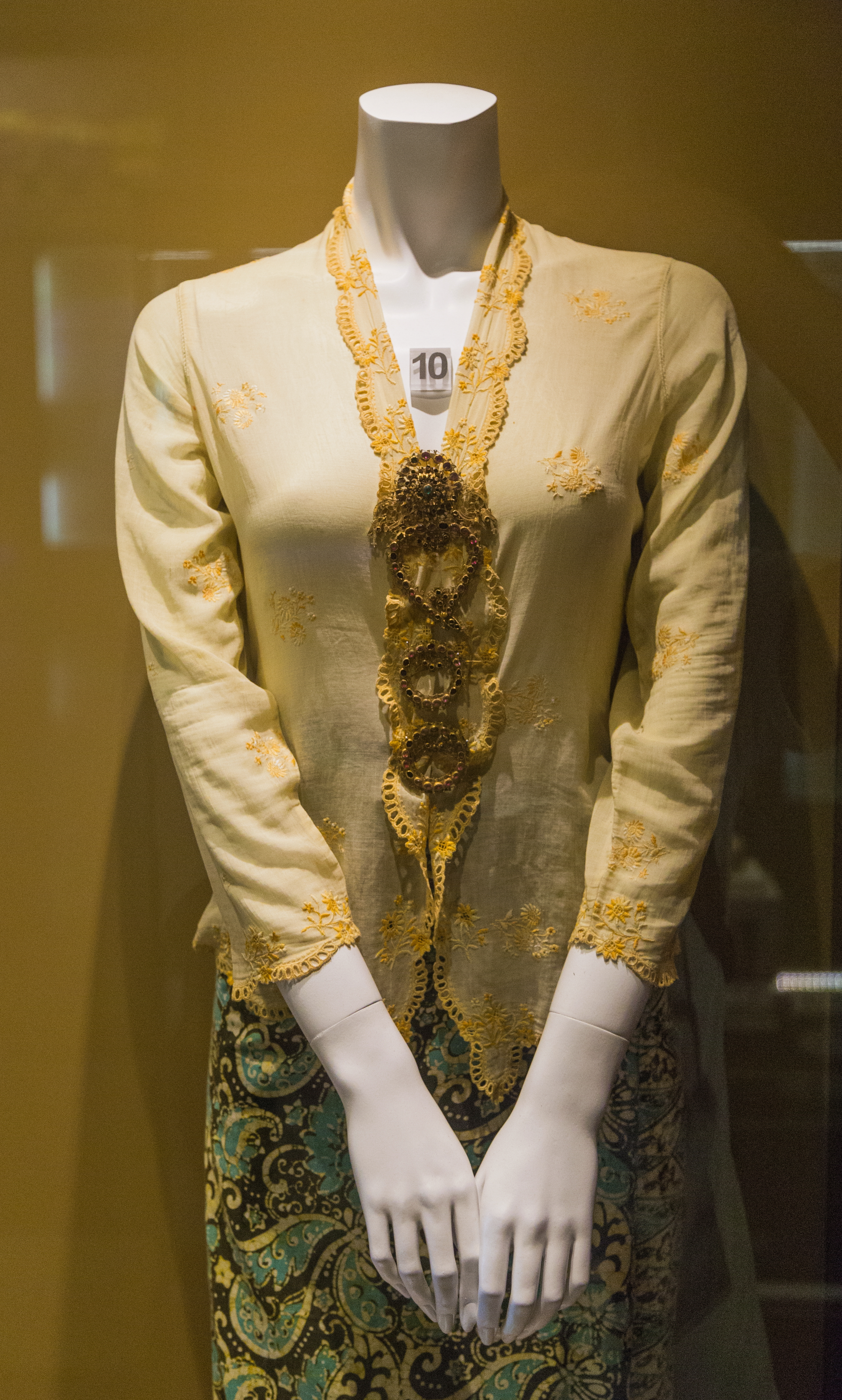
A kebaya worn with batik sarong by Peranakan women in the early 20th century

Further transformation of kebaya can also be attributed to European influences. By the 1910s, the base materials for kebaya began to change from fine white cotton to bright and transparent fabrics such as voile and organdie imported from France and Switzerland. By the 1920s, the German organdie and colourful printed voiles became popular. Through the introduction of European fabrics, kebaya became increasingly luxurious and glamorous, while the sarong overflowed with vivid colours. By the 1930s, the kebaya had become more colourful, decorated with cutwork, suitable for local ethnic taste.

By the late 1930s, the lace kebaya then evolved to cutwork kebaya with decorated scallops and cutwork embroidery at the edge (Note: Known as kebaya biku or kebaya kerawang in Malaysia, Singapore and kebaya kerancang in Indonesia) as the technological growth began to introduce fabric stencil sewing machines. The widespread use of sewing machines not only sped up the embroidery process but also opened up more kebaya design possibilities. This kebaya style is made by perforating the edging of the kebaya at the front, embroidering it with colourful threads to make it look like lace. It is considered the first kebaya to feature embroidery, an upgraded version of lace kebaya.

==== Embroidered kebaya ====
By the late 1940s, the cutwork kebaya then evolved to embroidered kebaya, (Note: Known as kebaya sulam in Malaysia, Singapore and kebaya bordir in Indonesia. Sulam is a Malay word for embroidery while bordir is a word borrowed from the Dutch term for embroidery) the quintessential Nyonya kebaya that is very popular until today. The embroidered kebaya is made of plain voile or gauze instead of the printed fabrics of a long kebaya. This style of kebaya stands out for its exquisite stencil that highlights the beautiful colours of the blouse, with famous designs include floral, figural and geometric motifs. This style of kebaya started to appear widespread during World War I as the rise in the price of lace led to the adoption of machine embroidery.

Although Peranakan kebaya has Javanese and Malay roots, it has evolved into a Peranakan community's distinctive outfit. The development of the embroidered kebaya is regarded as a Peranakan identity. The use of sarong kebaya in other Peranakan communities, namely Chetti Melaka, Jawi Pekan and Kristang also shows the influence of the Chinese Peranakans, which had started to wear the outfit much earlier in the 1920s and 1930s. Nevertheless, there are some slight differences between the kebaya worn by each community.

=== Independence ===
==== Brunei ====
There are four types of kebaya worn by women in Brunei, namely kebaya panjang, kebaya labuh, kebaya pendek and kebaya Bandung. In contrast with the first two styles, kebaya pendek and kebaya Bandung were introduced to Bruneian much later in the early 1950s, and were popular during the 1960s and 1970s.

==== Indonesia ====
During the colonial time up to the earlier times of the republic, kebaya was the Indonesian women's everyday dress in various regions. The wardrobe collections of elderly Indonesian always included kebaya as daily wear. After Indonesian independence from the Dutch, Sukarno, Indonesia's first president, appointed kebaya as a national attire of Indonesia. Kebaya as the national attire was often featured by Indonesian first ladies, notably Fatmawati and Dewi Sukarno, the wives of Sukarno. Nevertheless, the more democratic consensus of kebaya as the national attire took place in Jakarta, decades later in 1978, where kebaya was selected among four candidates.

==== Malaysia and Singapore ====
In contrast with the long kebaya, the short kebaya has been popular in Malaysia since 1920. The short kebaya does not only refer to the Nyonya kebaya, but it is also used to refer to other short kebayas like kebaya Bandung and kebaya Kota Bharu that appeared around the same era. Short kebaya generally consists of a figure-hugging blouse and is made to emphasize the shape of the body that is popular among young women, especially in major cities like Singapore, Kuala Lumpur and Penang.

By the late 1990s, during the era when Muslim women began to dress conservatively, kebarung, a new style of clothing that combined the elements of baju kurung and kebaya emerged as its modest look was preferred by the Malays.

== Attire components ==
The quintessential Javanese kebaya as known today is essentially unchanged, as noted by Raffles in 1817. It consists of the blouse (kebaya) with the central opening of the blouse fastened by a central brooch (kerongsang) where the flaps of the blouse meet, wore over a kain, and secured with angkin waist sash. The order of wear is: first undergarments, followed with kain panjang skirt secured with angkin sash, then the kebaya blouse is worn and usually secured with kerongsang. In Java, a certain hairdo is required in harmony with a traditional kebaya—the konde or sanggul hairbun, either of natural hair, or adding artificial extensions. The Javanese konde is secured with ornamented tusuk konde hairpin made of gold, silver or iron. The traditional kain kebaya attire with konde hairdo is considered as the epitome of Javanese ladies' elegance. On the other hand, among the Peranakan communities, the ideal kebaya sulam also includes decorative accessories such as a hairpin (cucuk sanggul), a silver belt for securing the sarong (pending), as well as a pair of beaded slippers (kasut manik).

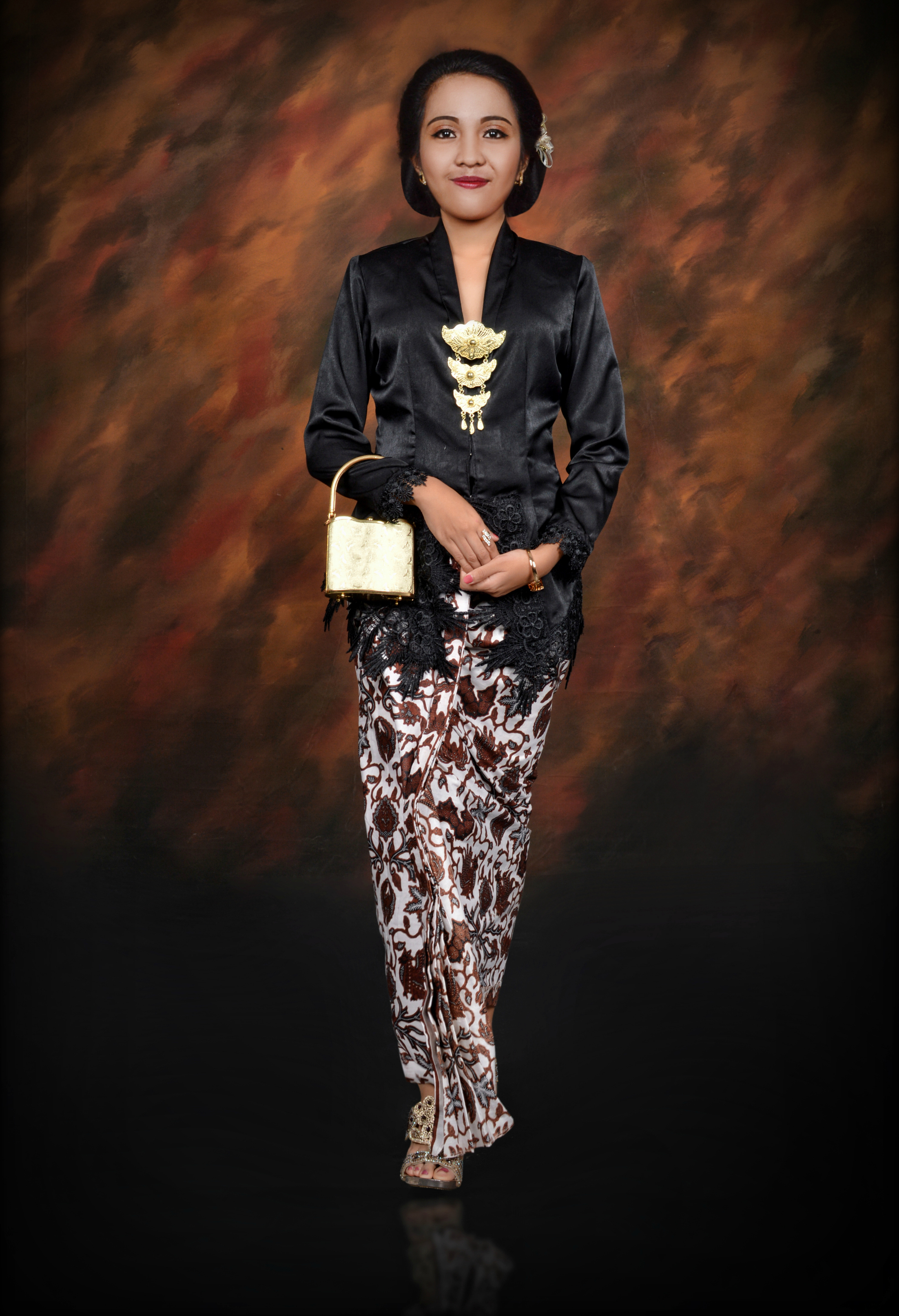
A Javanese style black silk kebaya secured with kerongsang brooch, worn over a batik sarong

Blouse (Kebaya)
The blouse is commonly semi-transparent and made from various materials, from cotton or velvet to fine silk, exquisite lace and brocade, decorated with stitching or glittering sequins and can be tailored tight-fitting or loose-fitting. In the Malay populated areas, a plainer and modest knee-length long-sleeved kebaya made out of songket or tenun is more common.

Undergarments (Kemben, Kutang or Baju Dalam)
Traditionally, Javanese women wear kemben while the Nyonya wear baju dalam beneath their kebaya to cover the breasts for modesty reasons due to the semi-transparent material of their kebayas. Today, the undergarment used under kebaya is usually either a corset, bra or camisole. The simpler and more modest undergarment worn by villagers, usually elderly women, is called kutang, which is a bra-like undergarment made from cotton.

Skirt (Kain or Sarong)
Kain panjang is a long cloth wrapped around the hips, secured with a belt and worn as a kind of sarong or skirt. The kain is an unstitched fabric wrap around three metres long while sarong is a stitched tube-like fabric wrap of the same length. For Javanese, Sundanese and Nyonya kebaya, batik is the most common, which may be from plain stamped cotton to elaborately hand-painted batik tulis embroidered silk with gold thread. In Bali and Malay populated areas, songket, tenun or other kinds of Balinese textiles are commonly used, often of matching fabrics with the blouse.

Sash (Angkin or Stagen)
After the kain panjang is wrapped around the wearer's hips and tied securely with a cloth rope, an additional waist sash akin to a cummerbund is wrapped around the hips. In Java, this long cloth is known as angkin—or its modern version might use stagen instead. Angkin refers to a long sash made of fabric, usually made of jumputan Javanese tie-dye, batik or plain cloth. Stagen refers to an elastic waistband, with embedded rubber, and usually secured with velcro or small hooks. In most of Indonesian kebaya, e.g. Kutu Baru and Javanese kebayas—the sash is always worn beneath the kebaya blouse, thus only visible on the front, while in Balinese kebaya the sash is clearly visible, similarly worn over the kebaya to the Japanese obi.

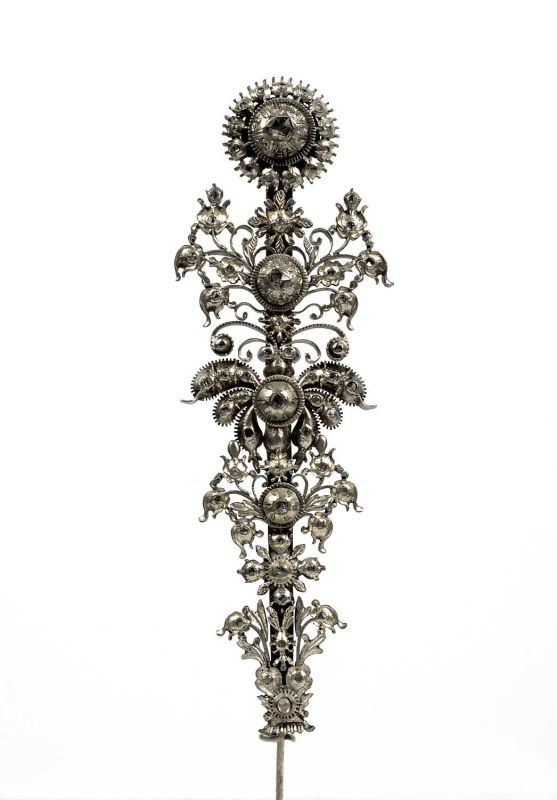
Silver kebaya kerongsang pin, Dutch East Indies circa 1927, collection of the Tropenmuseum

Brooch (Kerongsang)
To secure the blouse opening in the front, a decorative metal brooch is applied on the chest. It can be made from iron, brass, silver or gold, decorated with semi-precious stones. A typical three-piece kerongsang is composed of a kerongsang ibu (mother piece) that is larger and heavier than the other two kerongsang anak (child piece). Kerongsang made from gold was considered as the sign of the social status of the royalty and nobility; however, for commoners, simple and plain kebaya often only fastened with simple safety pins (peniti). Most of kebaya variants applied kerongsang to secure their front opening. However, certain style of kebaya that uses buttons instead, e.g. Balinese kebaya—usually do not wear any kerongsang.

Belt (Sabuk or Pending)
A kain panjang requires a helper to dress (literally wrap) the wearer and is held in place with a string (tali). The string is then folded at the waist and held with a belt (sabuk or ikat pinggang or pending). Similar to kain, sarong also sometimes requires a helper. A sabuk or pending functions as a belt to fasten the sarong as well as an accessory to the attire. Sabuk refers to "belt" while pending more precisely refers to metal belts made of a chain of metal pieces of silver, gold or brass. This metal belt is seldom used in most of kebaya variants and is only valid to specific kebaya styles.

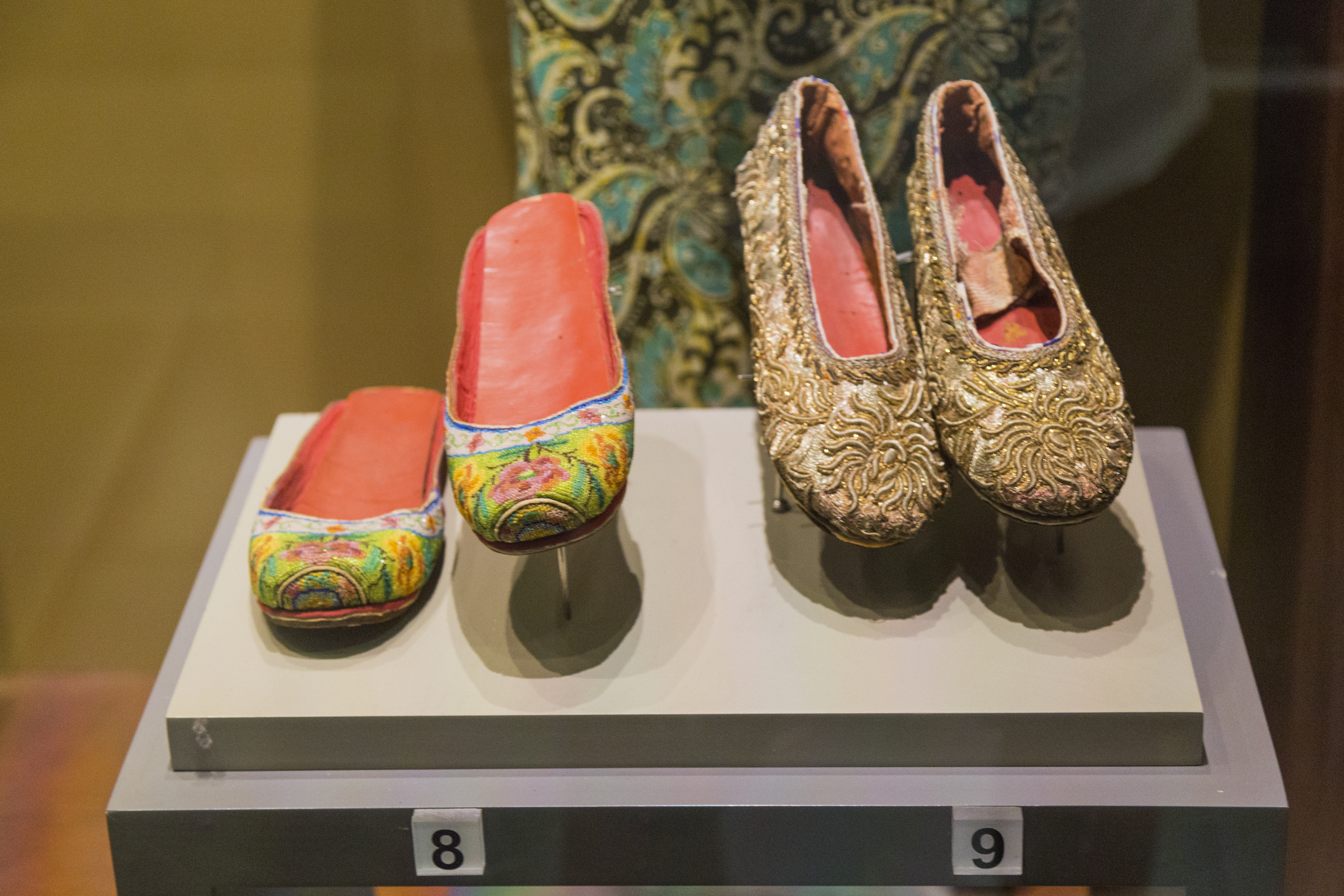
Beaded and embroidered shoes worn by Peranakan Nyonya

Shoes (Selop or Kasut Manik)
In order to complete her sarong kebaya outfit, Nyonya wear a pair of intricate and finely stitched beaded slippers called kasut manik. The kasut manik are made for two types of occasions. For joyful occasions, such as Sambot Taon, the beaded slippers are made of colourful beads with intricate patterns, while for mournful occasions, the beads used are black, white or blue with simpler patterns. These matching beaded slippers are seldom used in most of kebaya variants, only used in specific kebaya styles, i.e. the nyonya kebaya. In most of Indonesian kebayas, traditional Javanese selop, which are slippers made of leather or fabrics such as velvet, are commonly used. Modern kebaya uses modern women's shoes with matching colour instead.

== Varieties ==
=== Variants of Kebaya elements ===
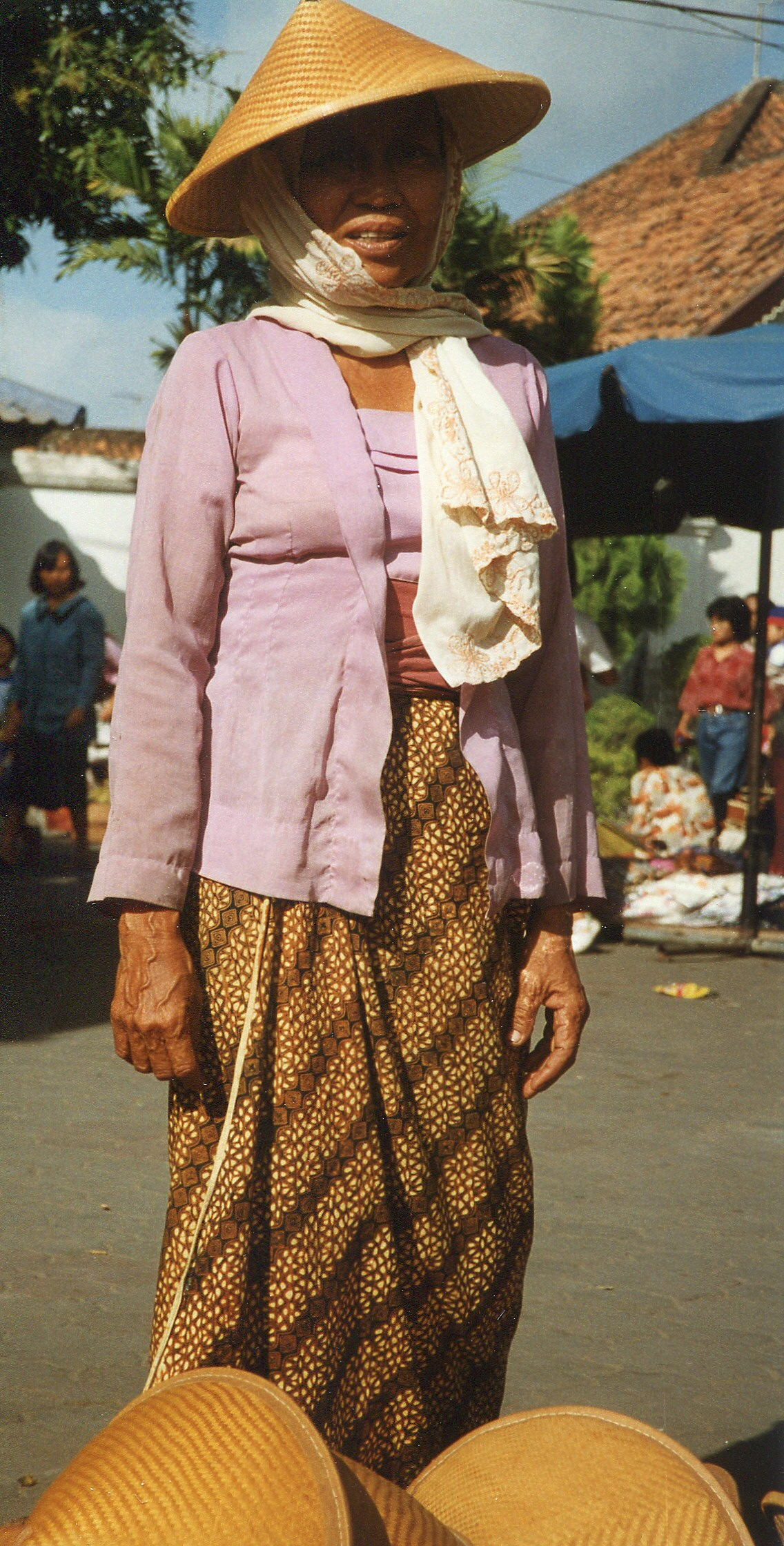
Simple Kutubaru kebaya (square collar) worn by a Javanese woman in Yogyakarta

Collars
In the aspect of the collar or neck cut, there are two main varieties; the V-shaped collar (Javanese, Kartini, Balinese, Malay, Cocos and Encim or Peranakan) and the square-shaped collar (Kutubaru or Kota Bharu). The Riau-Pahang kebaya has a band collar secured with buttons known as "cekak musang" while the Sundanese kebaya has a U-shaped collar, similar to the modern kebaya. The modern kebaya also might apply various shapes and curves of collars.

Fabrics
In the aspect of the fabric, the blouse may be of two main forms: transparent or semi-transparent materials of Javanese, Sundanese, Balinese, Cocos and Encim or Peranakan kebaya and the modest non-transparent materials of Kartini, Malay and Riau-Pahang kebaya. The Javanese kebaya is usually made of silk, cotton and velvet, while the Malay kebaya is usually made of locally woven textiles such as songket or tenun.

Cut and fittings
In the cut aspect, two main varieties are; the more tightly tailored Javanese, Sundanese, Balinese, Cocos and Encim or Peranakan kebaya, and the modest loose-fitting kebaya worn by conservative Muslim women. The more Islamic-compatible Malay kebaya is a loose-fitting, knee-length, long-sleeved blouse worn in the Malay populated areas of Malaya, Sumatra and Borneo.

=== Varieties in Indonesia ===
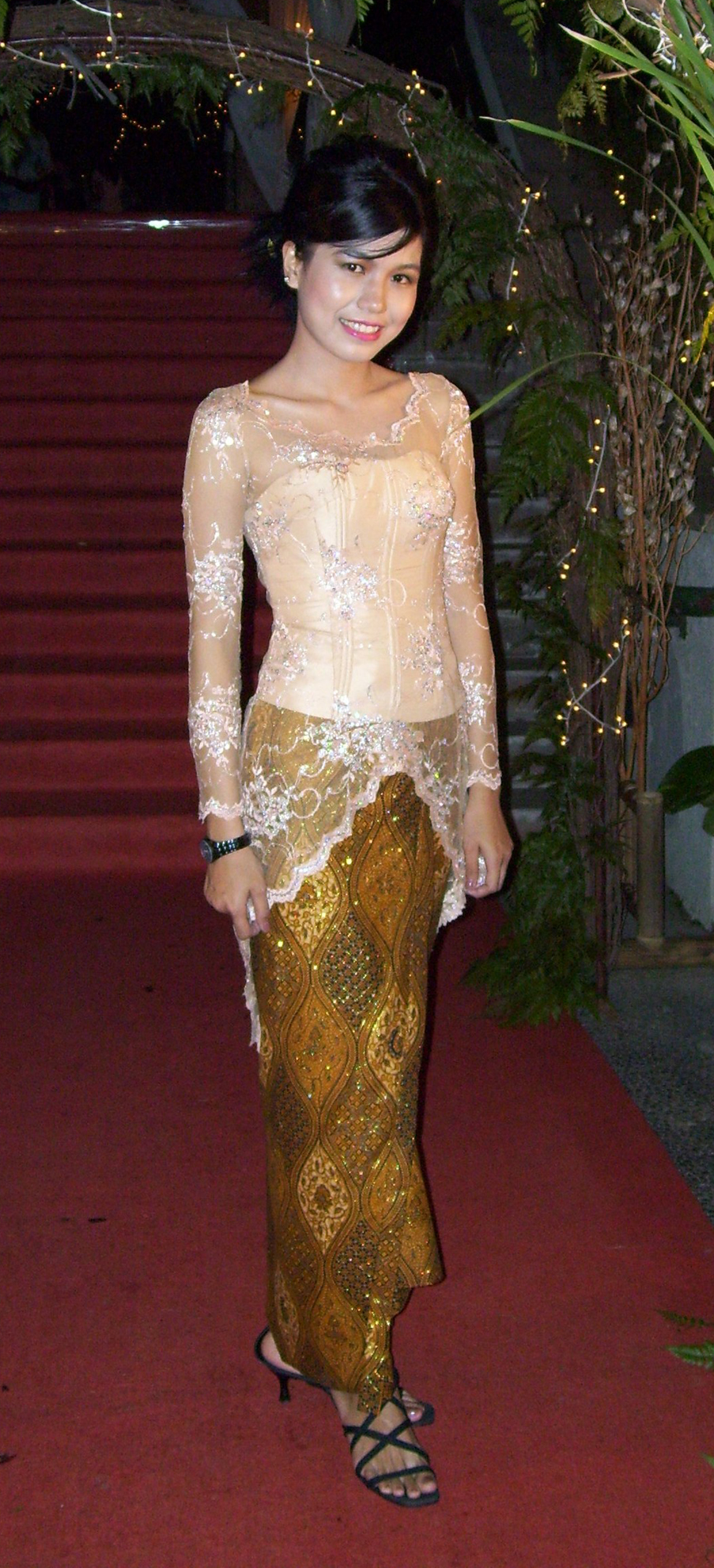
Indonesian woman in kebaya and kain batik. The trace of kemban (torso wrap) can be seen underneath the semi-transparent brocade kebaya.

==== Kartini kebaya ====
The type of kebaya used by aristocratic Javanese women, especially during the lifetime of Raden Ajeng Kartini, circa 19th century. Often the term "Javanese kebaya" is synonymous with the kebaya Kartini, although slightly different. Kebaya Kartini is usually made from fine but non-transparent fabrics, and white is a favoured colour. Basic Kebaya Kartini might be plain. The adornment is quite minimal, only stitching or applied laces along the edges. The V-shaped collar cut of this type of kebaya is quite similar to the Peranakan Encim kebaya, however, it is distinguished by its distinctive fold on the chest. Another feature of the Kartini kebaya is the length of the kebaya that covers the hips, and the collar folds with a vertical line shape, which creates the tall and slender impression of the wearer. The Kartini-style kebaya inspired the cut and style of Garuda Indonesia's flight attendants' uniform.

==== Kutubaru kebaya ====
The basic form of Kutubaru kebaya is quite similar to other types of kebaya. What distinguishes it is the additional fabric called bef to connect the left and right side of the kebaya in the chest and abdomen. This creates a square or rectangle-shaped collar. This type of kebaya was meant to recreate the look of an unsecured kebaya worn over a matching kemben (torso wrap) undergarment. Kebaya Kutubaru is believed to have originated from Central Java. Usually to wear this type of kebaya, stagen (cloth wrapped around the stomach), or rubber-enforced black corset is worn under the kebaya, thus the wearer will look more slender.

==== Javanese kebaya ====
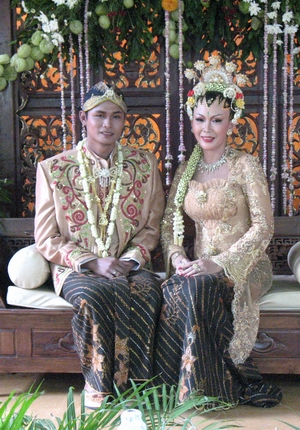
Kebaya and Batik are used in traditional Javanese wedding attire.

This type of kebaya from Java has a simple shape with a V-neck. This straight and simple cut gives an impression of simple elegance. Usually, a Javanese kebaya is made of semi-transparent fine fabric patterned with floral stitching or embroidery, sometimes adorned with sequins. Other fabrics might be used, including cotton, brocade, silk and velvet. The semi-transparent kebaya is worn over matching underwear, either a corset, bra or camisole.

==== Keraton or Solo kebaya ====
Keraton Kebaya, also known as Solo kebaya, is an aristocratic kebaya typically worn by noble women of the court of Surakarta Hadiningrat kingdom of the Solo city in Central Java. Despite popularly being called Solo (Surakarta) kebaya, this type of kebaya is actually also commonly worn as aristocratic dress for noble ladies in neighboring Javanese courts, including Yogyakarta, Pakualaman and Mangkunegaran.

Solo kebaya usually uses dark coloured fabrics, with black velvet as the most favoured material. The edge around the sleeves and along the collar up to the front opening and bottom edges are decorated with golden or silver beads and sequins. The cut of Solo kebaya is longer than common Javanese kebaya, usually up to the knee of the wearer. Solo kebaya is known for its elegance and is usually used for Javanese Solo Putri style wedding dresses.

==== Sundanese kebaya ====
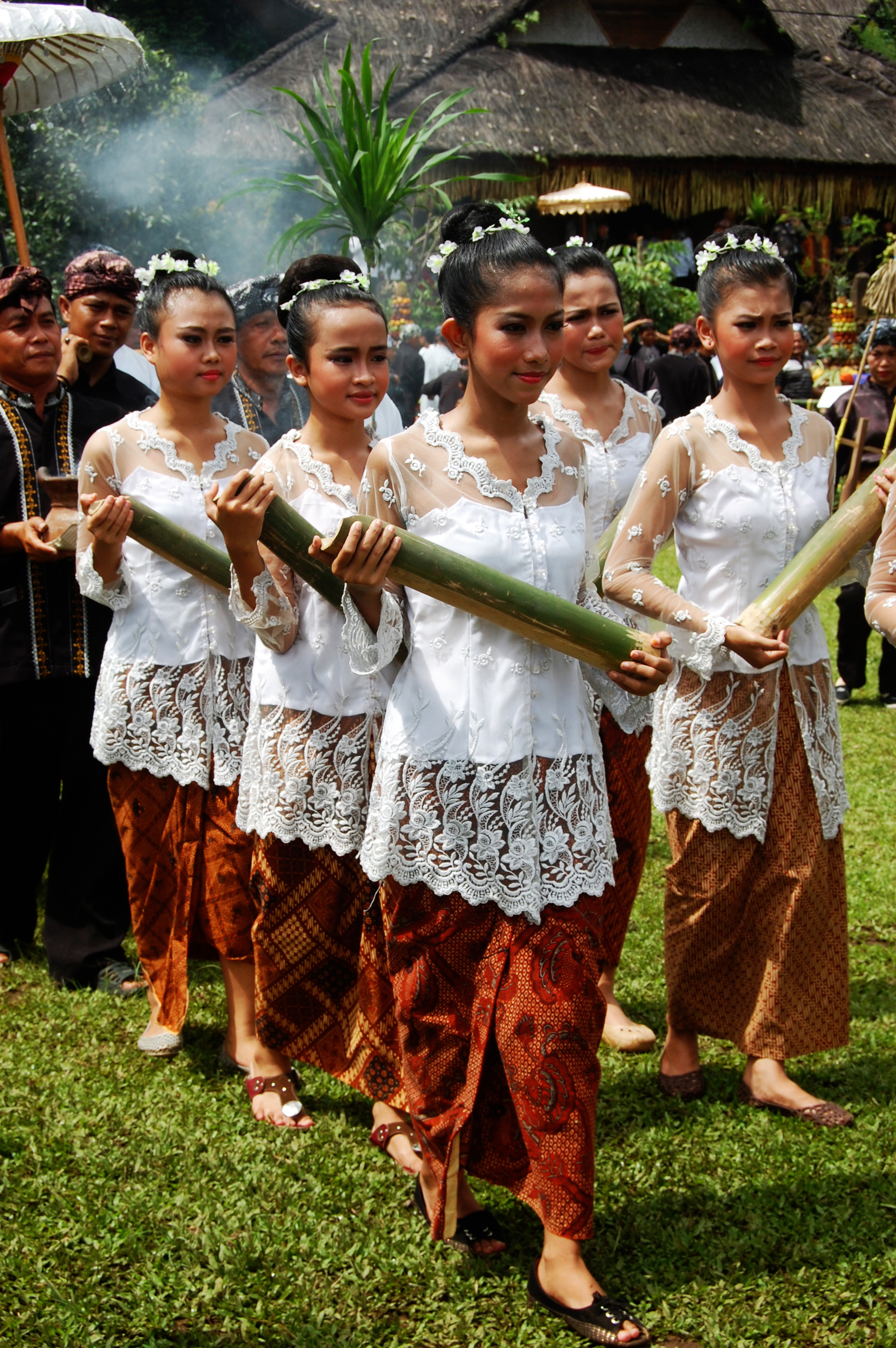
Girls in white Sundanese kebaya during Seren Taun harvest festival

Tight-fitting brocade Sundanese kebaya allows more freedom in design, and much applied in modern kebaya and wedding kebaya in Indonesia. The semi-transparent fabrics is patterned with floral stitching or embroidery. The main difference with other kebaya style is the U collar neckline, often applying broad curves to cover shoulders and chest. Another difference is the extra long lower parts of kebaya, with hanging edges which covers hips and thigh. Furthermore, they are known to very colourful and brightly coloured. The contemporary wedding kebaya dress even has sweeping long train. Historically, the Sundanese kebaya is separated into three different categories based on a person's social standing: the aristocrats, middle class workers, and the commoners, where they each have their own stylistic conventions that would have been followed by members of the class.

==== Bandung kebaya ====
This kebaya design originated from the city of Bandung in the 1950s. The distinctive feature of this kebaya is the kerah setali (shawl collar) that folds up to the chest. The cut is also unique in that the back is shorter than the front. The Bandung kebaya design is a very short kebaya with a length only up to the waist or a few centimetres below the waist, exposing the curved hips of the wearer. This rather daring design was meant for young maiden and considered as one of the most chic kebaya variant. It is often applied in modern kebaya fashion, unorthodoxly combined with tight kain sarong, pants or short skirts. Kebaya Bandung usually uses a shawl collar that forms a V-neckline with a slit on the front secured with buttons. The material used for the Bandung Kebaya is brocade combined with a long batik cloth.

==== Balinese kebaya ====
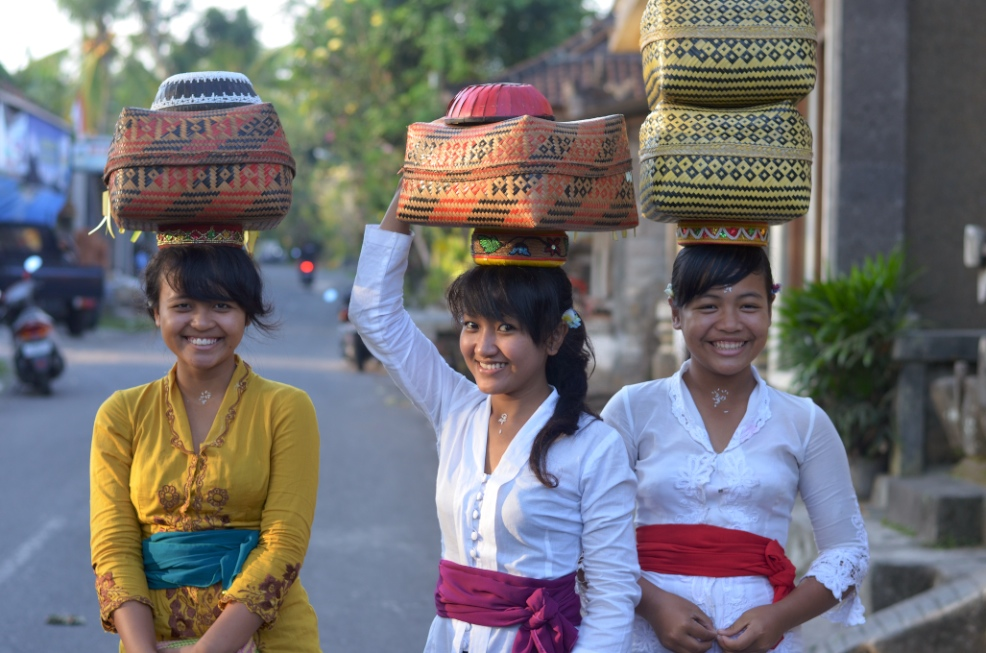
Balinese girls wearing a kebaya

Balinese kebaya is quite similar to Javanese kebaya, but slightly different. The Balinese kebaya usually has V neck line with folded collar sometimes decorated with laces. They are usually tight-fitting made with colorful semi-transparent or plain fabrics either cotton or brocade, patterned with floral stitching or embroidery. Unlike traditional Javanese kebaya, Balinese kebaya might add buttons in the front opening, and kerongsang brooch is seldom used. The main difference is Balinese kebaya add obi-like sash upon kebaya, wrap around the waist.

The Balinese kebaya is part of busana adat or customary dress, Balinese women are required to wear kebaya during Balinese Hindu rituals and ceremony in pura. White kebaya are favoured for Balinese religious rituals. Other than religious ceremony, contemporary Balinese women also often wear kebaya for their daily activities. Because most Balinese people are Hindus, the Balinese kebaya usually has shorter sleeves compared to Javanese kebaya.

==== Madurese kebaya ====
Kebaya Madura is the style of kebaya from the island of Madura off coast of East Java. It is also known as kebaya rancongan, it has a characteristic on the neck collar in the V shape. In addition, this kebaya is also equipped with jewelry to cover the neck and chest. The length of this kebaya is only up to the waist and tapers at the bottom. Kebaya Madura shows the curves of wearer's body, to create elegant silhouette.

==== Malay kebaya ====
Kebaya Labuh is a style of Malay kebaya which is quite similar to baju kurung. This type of kebaya used in Sumatra, particularly on Malay-populated provinces, including North Sumatra, Riau, the Riau Islands, Jambi, the Bangka Belitung Islands, and South Sumatra. Kebaya labuh is actually more specifically associated with the Melayu Lingga culture. The kebaya labuh consists of a loose, knee-length tunic and is usually made of semi-transparent fabrics. The central opening of the blouse-dress is usually wrapped by brooches and is traditionally worn with kemban, along with a sarong or songket around the hips.

==== Batak kebaya ====
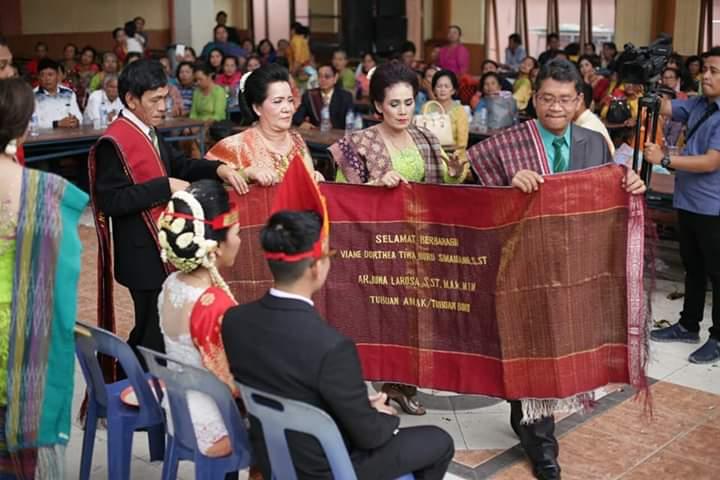
Batak people wear kebaya for special occasion such as for church or wedding, usually combined with ulos or songket.

Batak kebaya are variant of kebaya adopted by Batak people of North Sumatra. Traditionally Batak people wear ulos clothes wrapped around their body in similar fashion to Javanese kemben, and also draped around the shoulders. However, kebaya was relatively recent being adopted into Batak culture, mainly owed to national culture of Indonesia that promote the use of kebaya among Indonesians.

The cuts and materials of Batak kebaya is similar to Sundanese kebaya, which is brocade decorated with sequins, with U-shaped neckline and allows freedom in design. The favourite colours for Batak kebaya, especially for weddings are red, white, gold and black. There are three types of Batak kebayas; they are Batak Toba kebaya, Batak Karo kebaya, and Batak Mandailing kebaya. Batak kebaya usually wore as wedding dress or as formal dress, combined with traditional ulos cloth put around the shoulder, songket skirt, sortali head band of Batak Toba, traditional Karo head dress, or bulang golden crown of Mandailing style.

==== Ambon kebaya ====
Ambon kebaya refer to a type of kebaya being used in Eastern Indonesia, especially associated with Ambon city of Maluku Islands. During colonial times of VOC rules, the prevalence of kebaya in Dutch East Indies has led to the adoption of kebaya outside of its traditional realms in Java, including the Dutch possessions in Eastern Indonesia, such as in Minahasa and Amboina. Traditionally Ambonese ladies wear baju cele which is simple loose dress with neck hole has only three or four buttons near the front neckline. Ambon kebaya for women has two types; the kebaya putih panjang (long sleeved white kebaya) and kebaya hitam gereja (black church kebaya). Long sleeved white kebaya is made from white brocade with front opening secured either with buttons or golden pins. Black kebaya for church has cuts akin to baju cele shirt, it has long sleeves and made of black brocade, the sarong is also made of black brocade. Ambon kebaya usually worn combined with black cenela slippers with white socks, and the ladies usually also bring lenso laced handkerchief.

==== Minahasa kebaya ====
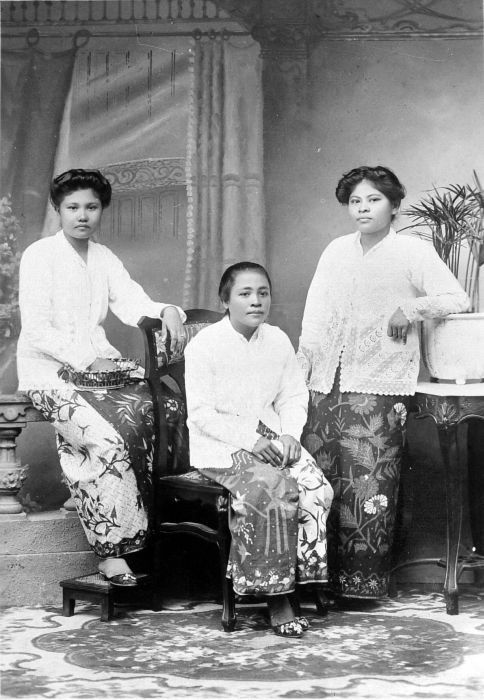
Maidens from Sangihe of North Sulawesi wearing kebaya, during colonial Dutch East Indies era

Minahasa kebaya is a type of kebaya used by Minahasan people of North Sulawesi. This Eastern Indonesian kebaya has common origin with Ambon kebaya and colonial noni indo kebaya, which was adopted during colonial era of VOC and Dutch East Indies. The cut is similar to Ambon and Dutch Noni kebaya, with white lace or brocade as the preferred materials.

White kebaya combined with kain batik sarong imported from Java used to be wore everyday in the past, but now usually confined for special occasion such as church or weddings. While for brides, white Minahasa kebaya is combined with white brocade long skirt with design resembles a fish tail called baju ikan duyung, thus the Minahasan bride resembles a mermaid.

==== Mongondow kabaya ====
Mongondow kabaya, or simply called kabaya, is a type of kebaya of Mongondow people of North Sulawesi and Gorontalo. Kabaya refer to blouse for the top, while the bottom skirt is called daing. If the kabaya is in the same colour as the daing it is usually called kabaya pasere. Usually kabaya of Mongondow has small flowers patterns.

==== Jumputan kebaya ====
Jumputan kebaya refer to kebaya that is made from kain jumputan or Javanese tie-dye. The jumputan patterns usually took forms of dots created from tie-die technique that represents small flowers akin to jasmines. The cut of kebaya may be kutubaru or Javanese style. The characteristic of this outfit is the addition of contrast coloured angkin or stagen waist cloths. Angkin is a type of sash or belt made of long clothes wrapped around the belly.

==== Lurik kebaya ====
Lurik kebaya refer to kebaya that is made from kain lurik or Javanese woven clothes. Kain lurik usually has dark earthy tone, ranged from light brown to dark brown and black. Unlike fine Javanese batik tulis or fine brocade, traditionally lurik are considered as simple and rather coarse clothes commonly wore by Javanese farmers or peasants. It is most specifically associated with Yogyakarta.

==== Kerancang kebaya ====
Kerancang kebaya refer to kebaya made from bordir kerancang or kerancang embroidery, a traditional craft of Betawi from Jakarta. Betawi culture has several types of kebaya, they are kebaya encim, kebaya kerancang, and kebaya panjang nyak Betawi. Kebaya kerancang are usually worn as the formal dress for the wedding party by the mothers of the bride and groom. The cut may be akin to kartini model with a sondai tip, tapering down at the front measuring 20 to 30 centimetres from the flat part of the hip, or it can be kebaya panjang nyak Betawi, which is a long kebaya with flat bottom edge measuring 3 to 5 centimetres above the knees. Kebaya kerancang usually has bright and vivid colours.

==== Noni or Indo kebaya ====
Indo kebaya is also known as kebaya Noni, derived from the term noni or nona which literally means "miss" to refer a young girl or unmarried woman of European descent. During the Dutch East Indies era of Indonesia, Indo women also colonial European women of high status adopted the kebaya, which provided less restrictive and cooler clothing, as a formal or social dress. Colonial ladies abandon their tight corset and wear light and comfortable undergarment under their kebaya. Indos and colonials probably adopted kebaya inherited from the clothing worn by Njai, native women kept as housekeepers, companions, and concubines in the colonial households. Njai ladies were the ancestors of Indo people (mixed European and Asian ancestry).

The cut and style of kebaya worn by the Dutch and Indo ladies were actually derived from Javanese kebaya. Nevertheless, there are some slight differences, European women wore shorter sleeves and total length cotton in prints, adorned with laces often imported from Europe. The kebaya worn by colonials and Indo ladies mostly are white and has light fabrics, this was meant to provide pleasant and cooler clothing in hot and humid tropical climate, since dark colored fabrics attract and retain heat.

The day kebaya of the Indo people was of white cotton trimmed with oriental motif handmade lace, either locally made in East Indies, or imported from Bruges or the Netherlands. While black silk kebaya is used for evening wear.

==== Encim or Peranakan kebaya ====
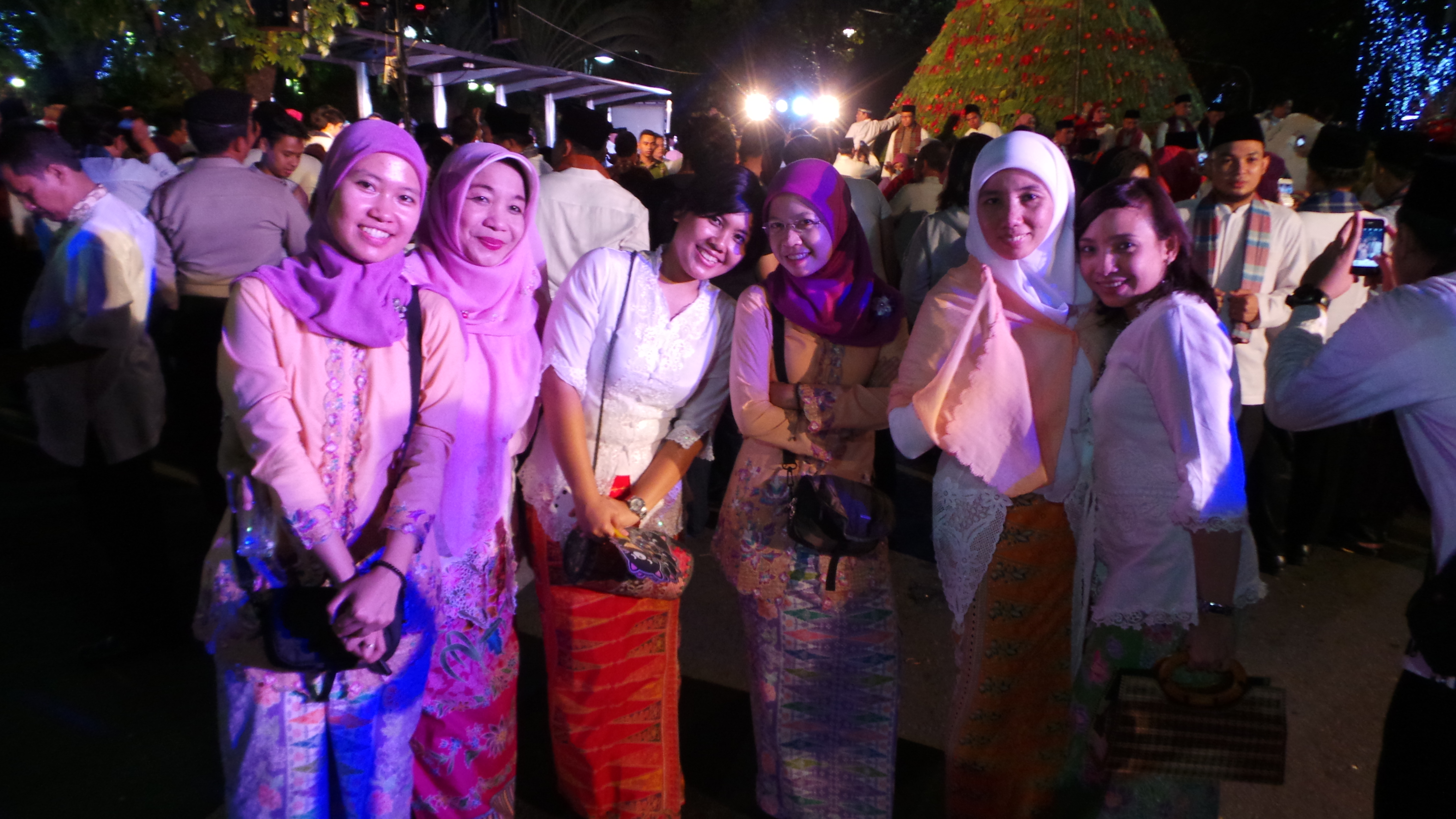
Encim kebaya as part of Betawi traditional attire

In Java, the kebaya worn by ladies of Chinese ancestry is called kebaya encim, derived from the name encim or enci to refer to a married Chinese woman. It was commonly worn by Chinese ladies in Javan coastal cities with significant Chinese settlements, such as Semarang, Lasem, Tuban, Surabaya, Pekalongan and Cirebon. Encim kebaya is also adopted as the traditional attire of Betawi people of Jakarta, thus it is no longer worn solely by Chinese Indonesians, but also by local Betawi people. It marked differently from Javanese kebaya with its smaller and finer embroidery, lighter fabrics and more vibrant colors, made from imported materials such as silk and other fine fabrics. The encim kebaya fit well with vibrant-colored kain batik pesisiran (Javan coastal batik).

It was this encim kebaya from coastal north Java, together with vibrant coloured Javanese coastal batik pesisir that has been exported to Straits Settlements of Singapore and Penang since colonial times in the 19th century, thus created the kebaya wearing culture among nyonyas of Peranakan Chinese in the Malay peninsula. The light and vibrant coloured encim kebaya has become the traditional dress of overseas Chinese ladies in the archipelago, from coastal Java to Sumatran port cities such as Medan, also Singapore, Malacca and Penang, and considered suitable for tropical climate of Southeast Asia.

==== Modern kebaya ====
For decades kebaya has inspired Indonesian fashion designers in their works. Indonesian fashion designers such as Anne Avantie, Adjie Notonegoro, Oscar Lawalata and Obin are known has experimented and created contemporary design of modern kebayas.

In term of design, the new category of "modern kebaya" itself is quite a broadly identified, since they can be inspired by Indonesian traditional kebaya, combined with foreign influences and designs, or made entirely in new modern fashion ideas. The modern kebaya may experimented with the collar cuts, the length of sleeves; with some has only one sleeve or no sleeves at all, the use fabrics and its patterns such as applying polka dots pattern, combining them with short skirts or pants, etc.

=== Varieties in Malaysia ===
==== Kebaya Melayu/ Kebaya Labuh/ Kebaya Panjang/ Baju Belah ====
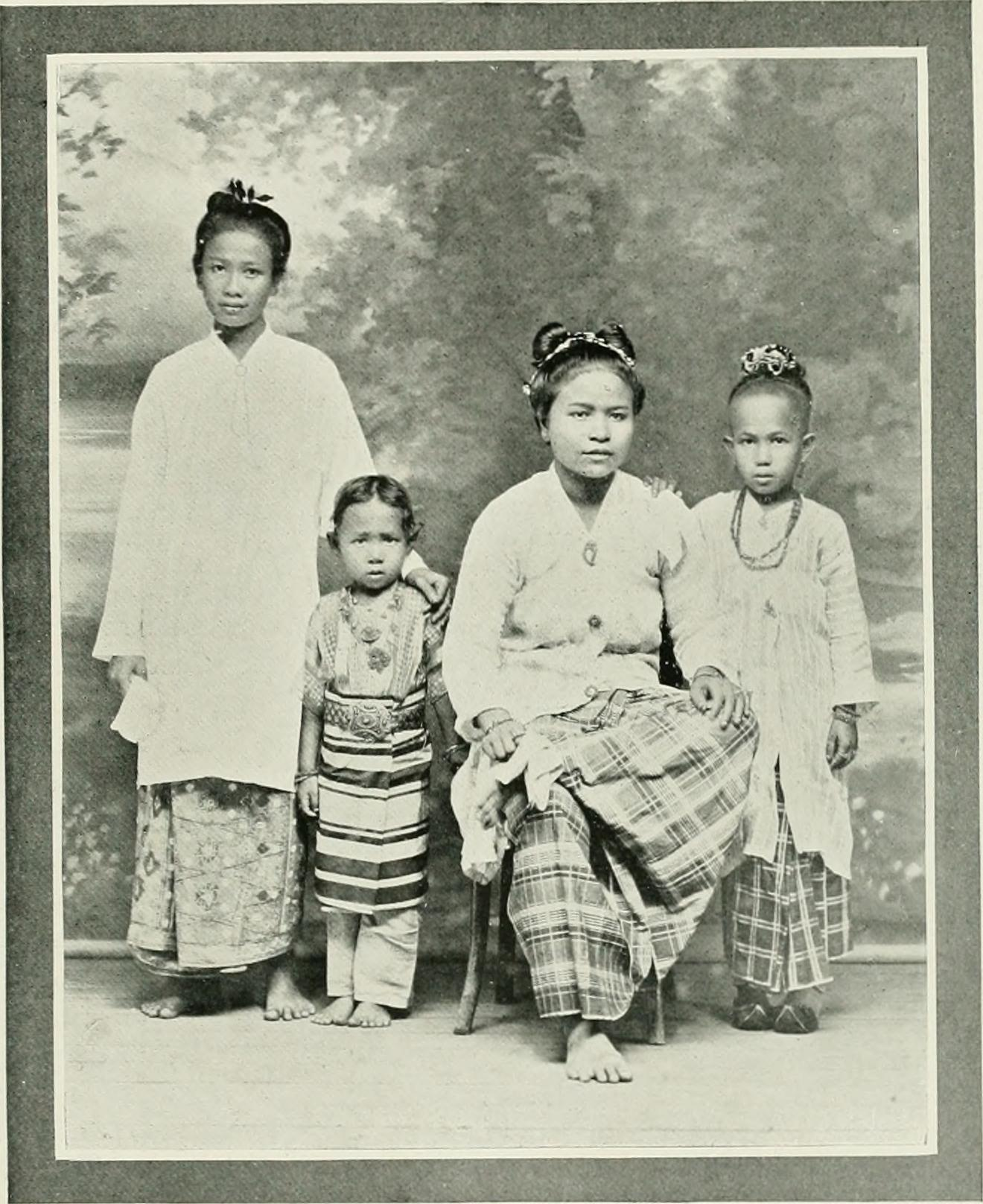
A Kelantanese Malay woman with children in traditional Malay kebaya

Although Malay women are famous for their Baju Kurung, kebaya sometimes is also being worn for both formal or informal occasions. The kebaya panjang is a knee-length, long-sleeved blouse, worn over a sarong. It is often elaborately embroidered with floral motifs on the cuffs and the front lapel, with a neckline that is usually V-shaped. Kebaya panjang resembles baju kurung in many ways. The only differentiation is it splits and fits in front of the dress, secured with kerongsang brooch. The original kebaya panjang was designed to reach the ankle, only an inch from the bottom of the sarong, with sleeves that were wide and long.

Another variety of the kebaya panjang is known as the kebaya labuh. This kebaya is a loose-fitting long blouse, worn with an undergarment known as baju pontong. The dress is designed with several small buttons as fasteners. Both kebaya panjang and kebaya labuh do not accentuate the shape of the body of the wearer as compared to the other Kebaya, namely kebaya nyonya. This style of kebaya is commonly worn by Malay women in Malaysia, Singapore and Brunei and are cherished by society as recent trends show that this dress is becoming more popular, although it is normally worn by older women.

Back in the old days, kebaya was considered common everyday wear for Malay women besides baju kurung, although the latter is more popular. However, the status has changed as it is now worn mostly to formal events and weddings. Still, this style of Malay kebaya continues to grow according to time with its characteristics of a split at the front that is covered with buttons or brooches still remains. In term of fabric choice, Malay kebaya is usually made of traditional textiles like tenun or songket.

==== Kebaya Riau Pahang/ Kebaya Turki ====
In Pahang, the local style kebaya is known as kebaya Riau Pahang or sometimes also known as Turkish kebaya. The difference between this style of kebaya and other kebayas is that it has a buttoned baju kurung "cekak musang"-like collar. Kebaya Riau Pahang is believed to have existed since the era of Johor-Riau-Lingga-Pahang in the 19th century or even earlier, during the time of Malacca Sultanate by researchers. It is not just a dress, it is also a sign of the good relationship between the Pahang and Riau-Lingga in the past. Kebaya Riau Pahang is also said to have originated from Turkey shaped-like robe where the dress extends to the level of the ankle and splits in front. It was said that Abu Bakar of Johor and his family often visited Turkey for a long vacation, from there the kebaya Turki was inspired.

Nevertheless, western influence can also be seen in modern wearers where the dress and the level of the sleeves have been shortened. This style of kebaya is usually made of locally produced Pahang woven fabric or songket. The difference in the status of the wearer is shown by the number of buttons, where the number seven and nine, decorated with semi-precious stones used to reserved for Pahang nobility.Kebaya Riau Pahang is usually worn with ombak mengalun style sarong with the kepala of the kain at the back, similar to the baju kurung. The status of the wearers can also be seen by the wearing of jewellery on the chest and scarf on the shoulder.

==== Kebaya Selangor ====
Selangor also has its own kebaya. Kebaya Selangor is the result of assimilation through the marriages between the Selangor royal family with their relatives of Perak and Kedah royal families as well as Bugis traditions of Sulawesi. In Selangor, the use of long and loose kebaya dress has been seen worn when doing daily activities as well as attending weddings since the beginning of the 19th century and spread throughout the districts of Selangor. It is also known as "The Malay Dress", matched with sarong cloth made from songket, batik or Bugis woven fabric, with the kepala of the sarong at the front. It shares the same characteristics as a kebaya but has a straight and lower hemline that usually reaches below the knees. The kebaya is also looser at the waistline than the ordinary kebaya and has four pleats in front. It is folded slightly around the neck and pinned with a kerongsang brooch.

Kebaya Selangor is matched with songket, batik or Bugis woven fabric, according to the ability or status of the wearer. There is indeed a difference in the fabric material used by the people as compared to the royal family. A cotton cloth that is matched with batik cloth or Bugis weaving was usually worn by the Selangor nobility while songket is only worn by the bride and groom. Nowadays, the use of kebaya Selangor has been varied according to the taste of the wearer. This style of kebaya was once displayed by Michelle Yeoh when attending the Datukship ceremony of Sultan Azlan Shah, the Sultan of Perak, in recognition of the fame she brought to the state.

==== Kebaya Setengah Tiang ====
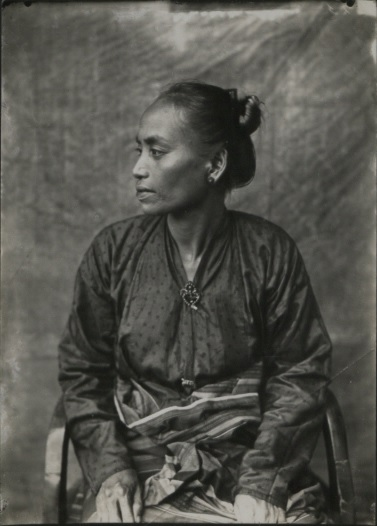
A Malay woman from Kuching, Sarawak wearing kebaya and kain dagang

Kebaya setengah tiang is a traditional attire of Negeri Sembilan. It is known as "setengah tiang" (half-mast) because it is a little longer than a short kebaya, but not as long as a long kebaya. This style of kebaya has its origins from kebaya panjang. The kebaya panjang was shortened to make it easier and comfortable for women to move while carrying out daily activities at home or outside. In the past, it was often used by women when they were at home, working in the fields or attending wedding ceremonies. Normally, it is paired with batik sarong. In the early 1950s, this style of kebaya was very popular and often styled at public gatherings. It has a pola potongan sembilan, the hem of the blouse is straight and the front of the dress looks like a long kebaya. Differs from other kebayas, kebaya setengah tiang has bell-sleeves.

The significant difference between formal and informal occasions is the choice of fabric materials used. For daily activities like working in the field, the kebaya is usually made of cotton cloth with flower motifs while for attending weddings, it is made of more expensive fabrics such as brocade, gauze, or woven songket of gold and silver thread. Women who style kebaya setengah tiang will often use kerongsang brooches, dokoh or necklaces as accessories as well as a headdress known as telepok.

==== Kebaya Perlis ====
Kebaya Perlis was very popular during the reign of Raja Syed Alwi in the 1930s where it was worn by the Perlis royal family and the state aristocrats for public gatherings and special occasions. This style of kebaya is not only comfortable to wear but also symbolises the identity and modesty of Malay women. Kebaya Perlis does not show the shape of the body and is suitable to be worn at work and official functions. One of the special features of the kebaya Perlis is that it is sewn from a whole piece of cloth without any stitches at the shoulders.

If seen from the front view, kebaya Perlis is similar to the shape of other kebayas but if seen from the rearview, it looks like a kebaya that has the same gussets as a baju kurung with no stitch on the shoulders. The size of kebaya Perlis is also loose, which make it suitable for people of plus size. In the past, it was made mainly using Kasa Rubia fabric as songket was totally prohibited except for the brides and royal families. Since the fabric was not easily available anymore, chiffon and songket fabric were made common.

Similar to other kebayas, kebaya Perlis also uses a decorative kerongsang brooch on the front fold of the blouse to secure the dress, often inserted diagonally. There are two versions of how to wear kebaya Perlis. The first style is by securing the folded front of the blouse with a brooch decoration while the other style is by stacking the front without folding it and secured it with a brooch decoration.

==== Kebaya Kota Bharu ====
Apart from being famous as Cik Siti Wan Kembang's style of clothing, Kelantan also has another popular traditional attire, namely kebaya Kota Bharu. Named kebaya Kota Bharu because this style of kebaya is widely worn by women in Kota Bharu and the state of Kelantan as a whole. The difference between the kebaya Kota Bharu and other kebayas is that it has an extra fabric known as lidah baju that connects the left and right side of the kebaya at the front of the kebaya. Differs from other kebayas, it does not need to be fastened with kerongsang but with snap fasteners that were sewed at the lidah baju. This style of kebaya is also known as kebaya bandung and might have been originated from kebaya Kutu Baru from Java. During the 1950s, kebaya Kota Bharu was very popular among women in Kelantan, where it is also known as baju potong medan. This style of kebaya has been modified into fashion icons with a various combination style of kebaya Kota Bharu and sarong exists.

==== Kebaya Saloma ====
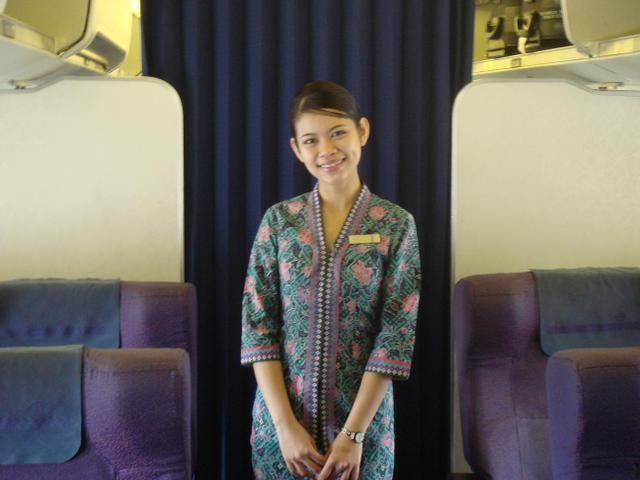
A Malaysia Airlines flight attendant wearing a kebaya inspired by Saloma

Saloma can be considered as the main trigger of the fashion and style trends of Malayan women in the 1950s and 1960s since appearing as a singer and actress of many adored Malay films. Saloma was a trendsetter. During the 1950s in which the Malays gripped firmly to the Asian values, Saloma occurs in a dress "alien" to the conservative Malay community at the time where she popularized western-style tights, body and chest revealing dresses with cuts across the shoulders. She started the tight-fitting "kebaya ketat" style, also known as "kebaya Saloma" with its wide neck and low back.

Details such as a front open slit on the sarong or a low-back tight-fitting kebaya were also popular even though would probably have not passed the Malay modesty standard these days. There are several examples of Saloma style kebaya, made from sheer polyester fabric, that she would wear over a black corset and paired with tight-fitting sarongs. This classic "kebaya Saloma" is not only becoming a staple for Malayan women at the time but also became an inspiration for the flight attendants of Malaysia Airlines (MAS) and Singapore Airlines (SIA).

==== Kebaya Nyonya/ Kebaya Sulam ====
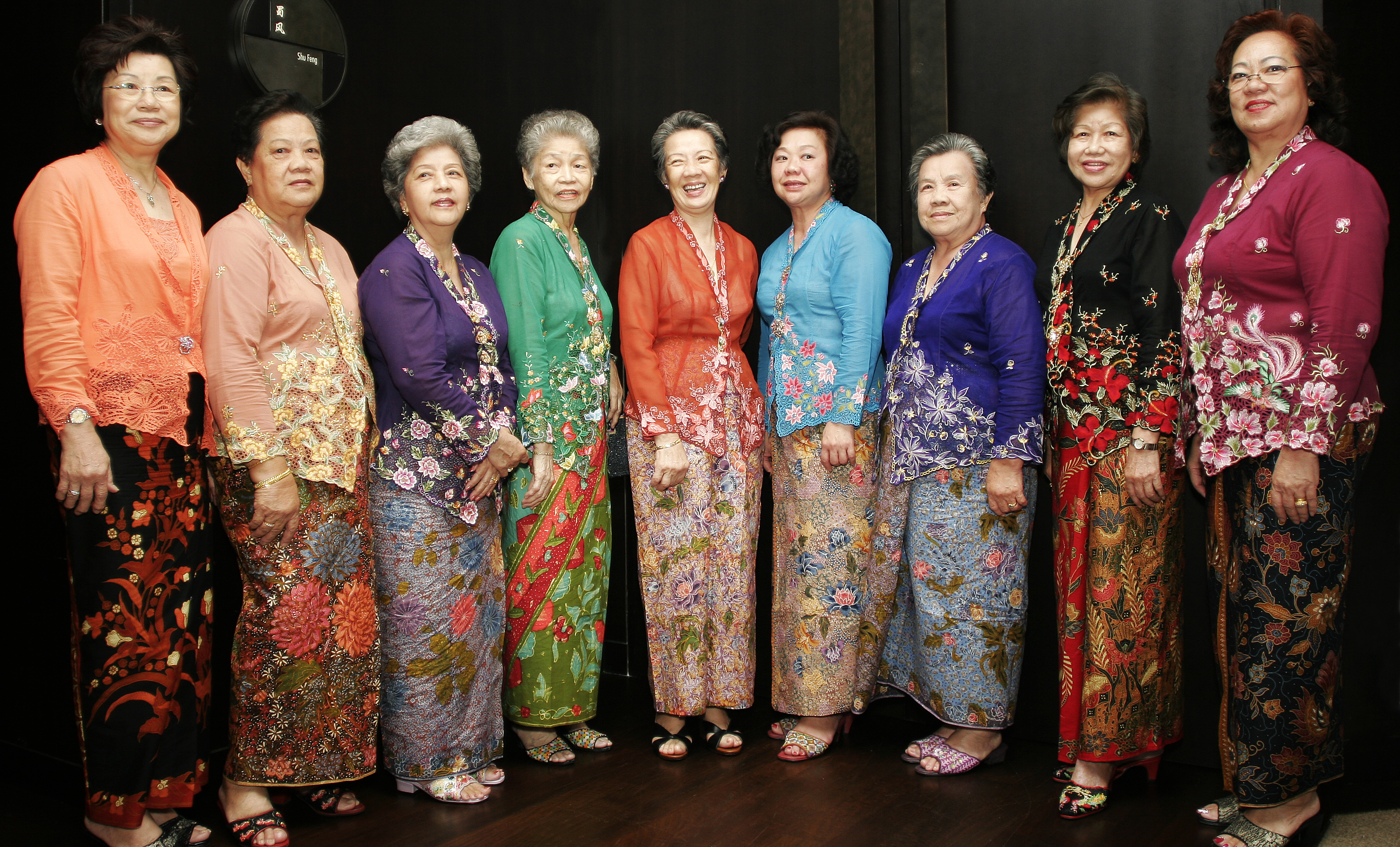
A group of women posing in the traditional Peranakan Nyonya kebaya

In the straits settlements of Malacca, Penang and Singapore, a different style of kebaya also exists, usually worn by those of Peranakan and Chinese ancestry. The Nyonya kebaya is famous for the use of lace and elaborate embroidery techniques that is traditionally worn with matching jewelleries and a pair of hand-beaded shoes. The Nyonya kebaya is a tighter-fitting sheer embroidered blouse that is traditionally paired with a batik sarong either drawn by hand or machine-printed.

The styles of Nyonya kebaya can be classified into three main periods, each style has a design that is connected with the fashion and technology trends at that moment. The three styles of Nyonya kebaya are kebaya renda, kebaya biku and kebaya sulam. Kebaya renda, the earliest Nyonya kebaya uses lace, kebaya biku, an improved version of kebaya renda uses embroidery only at the hem of the dress while the kebaya sulam is the quintessential Nyonya kebaya that we know today. Among popular embroidery motifs for kebaya sulam include flowers, butterflies, phoenixes, dragons and insects. The sarong on the other hand often uses hand-drawn batik cloths from Java.

Being semi-transparent, the Nyonya kebaya is usually worn over a camisole and secured at the front by a set of three interlinked kerongsang brooches. The traditional Nyonya kebaya outfit is completed with decorative accessories such as a cucuk sanggul hairpin, a silver pending belt for securing the sarong, as well as a pair of kasut manik beaded slippers. Traditionally, there also exists a kebaya that is worn specifically for mourning, known as kebaya tuaha. The colour of kebaya tuaha represents the different stages of a mourning period.

Some resources claim that Nyonya kebaya originated from Java, Medan or Surabaya. Conversely, there are some writers who claim that Penang or Malacca was indeed the origin of the Nyonya Kebaya, having adopted the dress independently. Nevertheless, similar Nyonya Kebaya can also be found in Phuket and Medan, where they shared the similar Peranakan culture.

==== Kebaya Chetti ====
The use of kebaya and sarong in Chetti Melaka culture shows the influence of the Baba and Nyonya which had started to use the dress in the 1920s and 1930s. There are some differences between the kebaya worn by Indian and Chinese Peranakan. The Chetti women are generally more conservative, in favour of opaque material for their kebaya, compared to Nyonya kebaya which prefers semi-transparent fabric. It also tends to be plainer, with fine or no embroidery at all.

This style of kebaya is also different from the Malay kebaya. Kebaya wore by Chetti women often have the form of a deduction 'V' neck while the kebaya wore by Malay women usually straight down. This style of kebaya is also worn with three brooches in various shapes and patterns as well as a pair of kasut manik to complete the look for more formal occasions.

Nevertheless, the Chetti women would wear the sarong kebaya just as the Peranakan Chinese would, incorporating Indian elements such as a thali, pottu as well as a gold chain for married women. The wearing of kebaya on Deepavali morning has also become a cultural practice among Chetti community, a tradition passed for generations.

==== Kebaya Jawi Pekan ====
In Penang, apart from being popular with Nyonya kebaya, there is also a style of kebaya from the Jawi Pekan, the locally born Malay-speaking Muslims of mixed Indian, Malay as well as Arab ancestry. The Jawi Pekan community is very similar to the Mamak community but can be distinguished through their names, facial features, as well as the Malay dialect used. There are subtle differences in cut and design that distinguish the kebaya of Jawi Pekan from that of Mamak.

The Jawi Pekan generally prefers kebaya that is made of lace with decorated sequins while Mamak prefers kebaya that is made of sari cloth that was directly imported from India. The choice of material is largely influenced by the historical ties between the Jawi Pekan with their colonial heritage and the Indian Muslims with India. Among the Jawi Pekan community, a married woman will usually wear a long kebaya while unmarried women will often opt for the short kebaya. Women from this community are often seen wearing matching colours for their clothes.

==== Kebaya Kristang ====
There are two types of kebayas among the Kristang community in Malacca, namely the kebaya kompridu and the dabaia kurtu. During the early 16th century, the Portuguese settlers married local Malay women. With this maternal influence, Kristang women also wore the kebaya panjang and the sarong kebaya. Nevertheless, kristang dancers continue to wear traditional Portuguese dance costumes for performances. Kebaya kompridu means long kebaya while dabaia kurtu means short kebaya. Kebaya kompridu is considered as the traditional formal dress for special occasions while the latter is usually worn by the younger generation.

The difference between these two forms of dress lies in the blouse. Kebaya kompridu is a three-quarter-length blouse while the blouse used with sarong kebaya is short. Both kebayas are fastened with a set of three gold kerongsang pins and are worn over a saias, a sarong, similar to the other kebayas. For weddings, the bride may also opt to wear a white kebaya and saias with an elaborate golden headdress and ornate necklace. Both forms of kebaya show Malaysian origin and link the women of the Portuguese Settlement to their neighbours of Baba Nyonya and Chetti Melaka rather than the continental Portuguese.

==== Kebaya Cocos/ Kebayak and Baskat ====
The Cocos Malays of Sabah also have their own traditional style of kebaya, believed to have been influenced by their Javanese ancestors. They were originally from the Cocos Islands who settled in Sabah in the 1950s. Along with them, they brought their unique blend of English-Scottish traditions and Malay cultural practices.

When attending weddings, ceremonies or performing traditional dances, Cocos Malay females are often dressed in kebayak, a type of kebaya with a frill collar influenced by the European style of clothing in the 1600s. Kebayak is worn over a white corset and kain sarong. The front of the kebayak is fastened with kerongsang brooch, similar to other kebayas.

There is not much difference between kebayak and baskat, the kebaya-like dress worn by the Cocos Malay males during performing traditional dances. The male baskat designs are almost identical to the woman kebayak, but is made shorter and worn along with a sabok, a belt. A sabok functioned as a belt to fasten the sarong as well as an accessory to the attire. The attire is then completed with a songkok pinned with flowers and black leather shoes.

For weddings, the bride needs to wear a blue kebayak and three sabok to fasten the sarong, usually in blue, red and yellow. The wedding dress then completed with a yellow selendang that is tied at the upper torso of the bride. The colour blue and yellow are the official colours of Jukong where the blue represents loyalty and the ocean and the yellow represents cheerfulness within the community.

==== Kuyu Kebaya ====
As one of the indigenous tribes of Borneo, the Murut community also has a unique kebaya-like traditional dress known as kuyu kebaya. This dress is made of black coloured velvet fabric and can be divided into two parts, the kebaya and the sarong. In the past, the kebaya was made plain, however, according to change of time, the kebaya is now made with additional stitches of colourful fine beads or with sequins designed with traditional tribal motifs like flower, leaves or bamboo shoots. Kebaya with decorated beads is usually worn by married women. The colours of the beads are usually white, yellow, red and green while the colours of the sequins are usually more colourful, preferred by the younger generation.

This style of kebaya is also worn by the female dancers during traditional performances at wedding or festivals. Kuyu kebaya usually worn with other traditional accessories like peta uluh, a traditional headdress, or siraung, a traditional hat made with decorated beads as well as a belt, necklaces, bracelets and anklet made with decorated beads.

==== Kebarung ====
Kebarung is a combination of the acronyms of "kebaya" and "Kurung". This style of clothing originated from Selangor and was very popular in the early 1990s throughout Malaysia. Its popularity is mainly credited to its loose and long top which is preferred by the more conservative Malays. It is considered to be both modest and elegant at the same time. Traditionally, textiles such as songket, cottons, and woven fabric were frequently used but imported silk or other textiles may also be used instead. The common accessory is dokoh, a piece of jewellery with three brooches made of tin, gold, or silver. Among the local artists who have been fashion icons of kebarung are Ziana Zain and Erra Fazira.

== Political significance ==
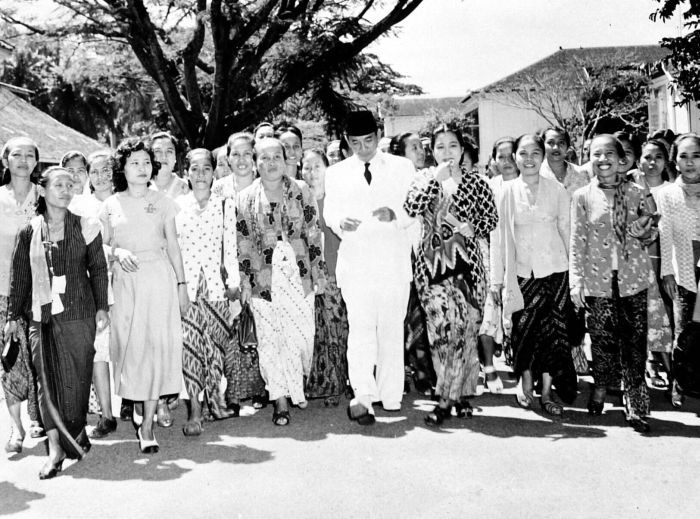
Sukarno among Indonesian women in kebaya during Indonesian Women Congress, 1950

In WWII internment camps of the Japanese occupation of the Dutch East Indies, Indonesian female prisoners refused to wear the Western dress allocated to them and instead wore kebaya as a display of nationalist and racial solidarity to separate them from fellow Chinese, Europeans and Eurasian inmates. In fact, the only woman present during Proclamation of Indonesian Independence, Dutch-educated activist S. K. Trimurti wore kebaya, cementing it as the female dress of nationalism.

After the Independence of Indonesia in 1945, Indonesia's first president, Sukarno has chosen kebaya as the national attire for Indonesian women. Subsequently, kebaya is encouraged to be worn by Indonesian first ladies, the wives of state officials, and also common Indonesian women during official functions and events. Kebayas as the national attire of Indonesian women were often featured by Indonesian first ladies. Fatmawati and Dewi Sukarno, the wives of Sukarno, Indonesia's first president, were known to wear kebaya every day. Subsequently, it has become a norm for Indonesian first ladies to wear kebaya on formal occasions.

Nevertheless, the more democratic consensus of kebaya as the national attire actually took place in 1978. The determination of Indonesia's national dress originated from a 1978 conference and workshop in Jakarta, which was attended by representatives of all provinces in Indonesia. In this workshop, fashion and cultural observers gathered to determine one national dress of the republic. From many types of clothing in Indonesia, at that time, there were four candidates for the national dress, namely kemben, kebaya, baju kurung, and baju bodo.

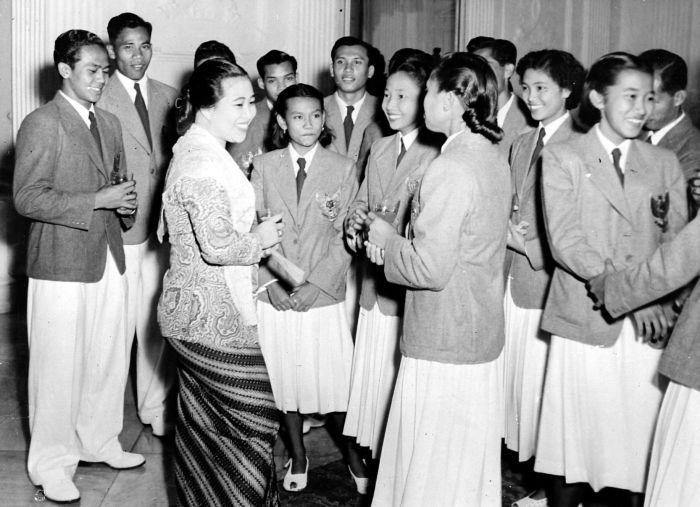
Fatmawati Sukarno, Indonesian first lady in kebaya with Indonesian athletes for the Asian Games in New Delhi (1951)

At that time kemben was most strongly associated with Java, baju kurung with Sumatra and Kalimantan and baju bodo with Sulawesi and eastern Indonesia. Kebaya is considered the most neutral and commonly accepted candidate. It has always been a part of people's lives in every region in Indonesia for ages, even during the colonial era, the early independence era to the modern era. Thus, it has become the official national attire of Indonesia, and one of the country's national identities.

The Suharto-era bureaucrat wives' social organisation Dharma Wanita wears a uniform of gold kebaya, with a red sash (selendang) and stamped batik pattern on the kain unique to Dharma Wanita. The late Indonesian first lady and also a minor aristocrat Siti Hartinah was a prominent advocate of the kebaya.

Former President Megawati Sukarnoputri is a public champion of kebaya and wears fine red kebaya whenever possible in public forums and 2009 presidential election debates.

The 21st of April is celebrated in Indonesia as National Kartini Day where Kartini, the female suffragist and education advocate, is remembered by schoolgirls wearing traditional dress according to their region. In Java, Bali and Sunda, it is the kebaya.

== Modern usage and innovations ==
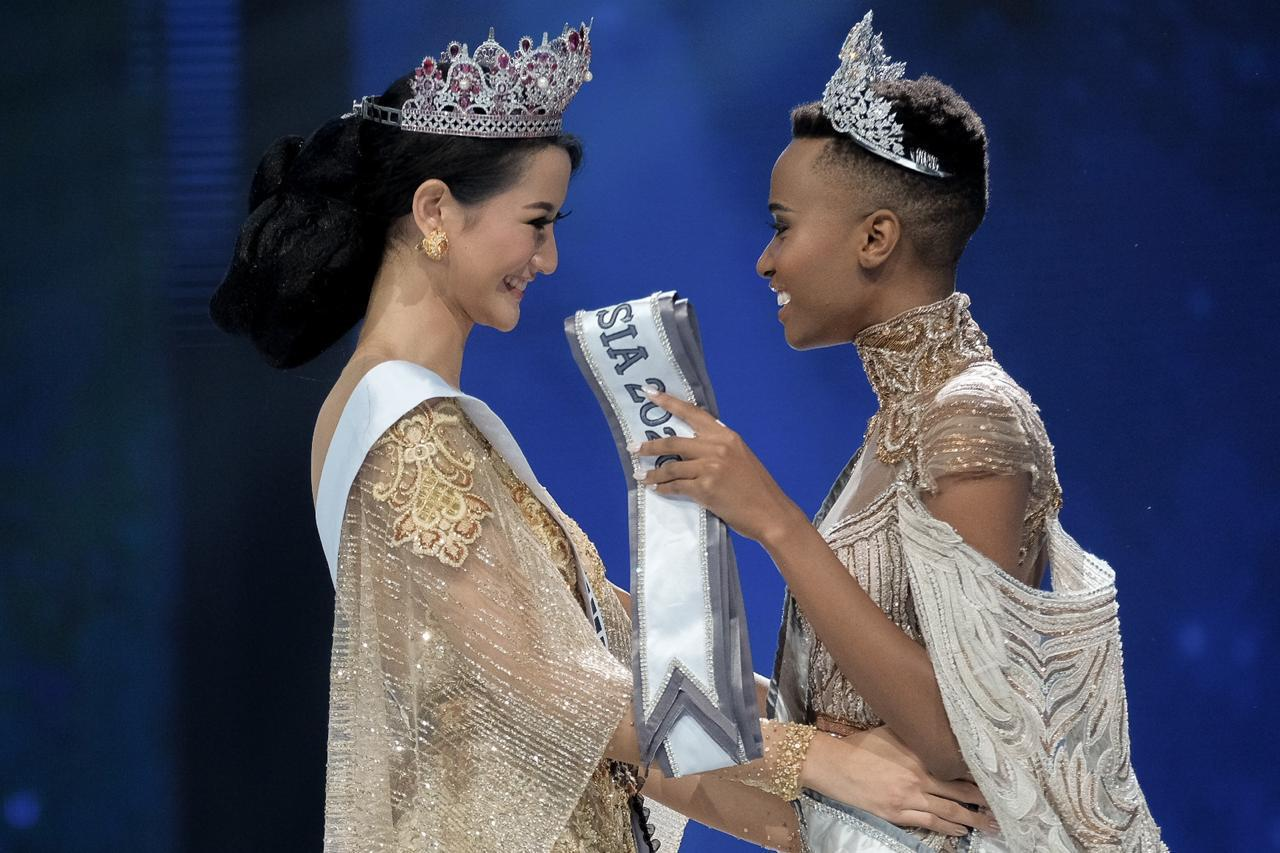
Puteri Indonesia 2020 (Miss Universe Indonesia 2020), Raden Roro Ayu Maulida Putri together with Miss Universe 2019, Zozibini Tunzi of South Africa wearing Indonesian modern kebaya

Kebaya has been an important part of oriental style clothing that heavily influenced the world of modern fashion. Lace dresses are one of the best examples of Kebaya influence.

Apart from traditional kebaya, fashion designers are looking into ways of modifying the design and making kebaya a more fashionable outfit. Casual designed kebaya can even be worn with jeans or skirts. For weddings or formal events, many designers are exploring other types of fine fabrics like laces to create a bridal kebaya.

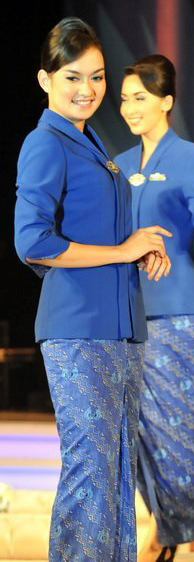
Garuda Indonesia flight attendant uniform in kebaya and kain batik

Modern-day kebaya now incorporate modern tailoring innovations such as clasps, zippers and buttons zippers, being a much appreciated addition for ladies' that promptly need a toilet break, without requiring being literally unwrapped by a helper—to the extent the true traditional kain is near unanimously rejected. Other modern innovations have included the blouse baju kebaya worn without the restrictive kemben, and even the kebaya blouse worn with slacks or made of the fabric usually for the kain panjang. The female flight attendants of Malaysia Airlines and Singapore Airlines also feature batik kebaya as their uniforms.

The female uniform of Garuda Indonesia flight attendants is a more authentic modern interpretation. The kebaya is designed in simple yet classic Kartini-style kebaya derived from 19th century kebaya of Javanese noblewomen. The kebaya made from fire-proof cotton-polyester fabrics, with batik sarongs in parang or lereng gondosuli motif, which also incorporate garuda wing motifs and small dots representing jasmine.

In 2019, there is a surge of kebaya popularity among modern Indonesian women. At MRT stations in Jakarta, a number of kebaya enthusiasts campaigned to promote kebaya as an everyday fashion for work as well as for casual clothing on weekend. The movement sought to make wearing kebaya the norm among Indonesian women. After quite a long time losing to compete with Western and Muslim fashion, kebaya saw a revival in 2019 in Indonesia, as rising numbers of kebaya enthusiasts proudly don the kebaya in public space. Kebaya began to come out of its "cultural cage"—namely wedding receptions and other traditional events—to public places. Kebaya is starting to appear again in government and private offices, at bus stops, commuter train stations, Transjakarta shelters, in cafes, and malls in Jakarta and other areas. During Hari Kemerdekaan (independence day) ceremony on 17 August 2019 in Merdeka Palace, kebaya being proudly worn by VVIP and elites of Indonesian society; namely from first lady, female state ministers, to the wives of state officials and distinguished guests.

Currently, Indonesia is making efforts for kebaya to be recognised as an Intangible Cultural Heritage to the UNESCO. There are some efforts to return the kebaya to its honorable place as Indonesia's fashion icon; by urging Indonesian women to wear kebaya for daily use. Efforts including "Selasa Berkebaya" (Tuesday Kebaya) movement among Indonesian women to popularise the daily use of kebaya. However, some conservative Islamic clerics have condemned the movement as a "veiled apostasy", aimed to demote the use of hijab among Indonesian Muslim women. Indeed, some suggested that the kebaya-wearing movement is actually a counter-action against the increasing conservatism and Arabization within Indonesian society, that warily saw the increase of niqāb-wearing among local women. In December 2024, the kebaya was recognised as part of UNESCO's Intangible Heritage list as part of a joint submission by Brunei, Indonesia, Malaysia, Singapore and Thailand.

Kebaya has traditionally regarded with a feminine appeal, with "Miss Kebaya" pageants being very popular throughout the region and abroad.

== Gallery ==
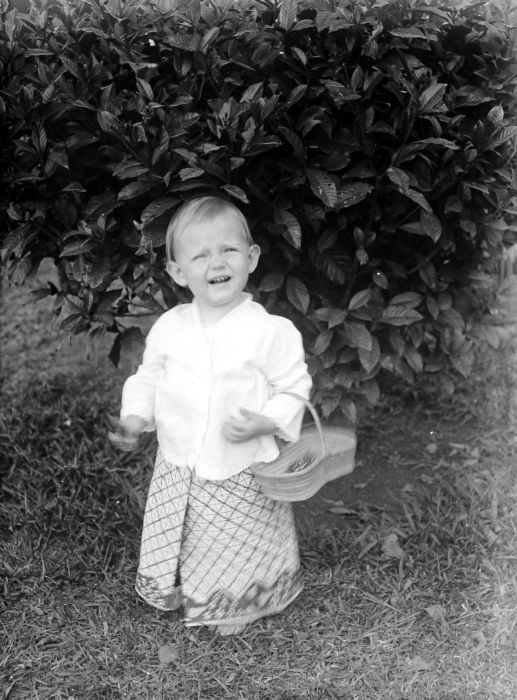
European child with sarong and kebaya, early 20th century

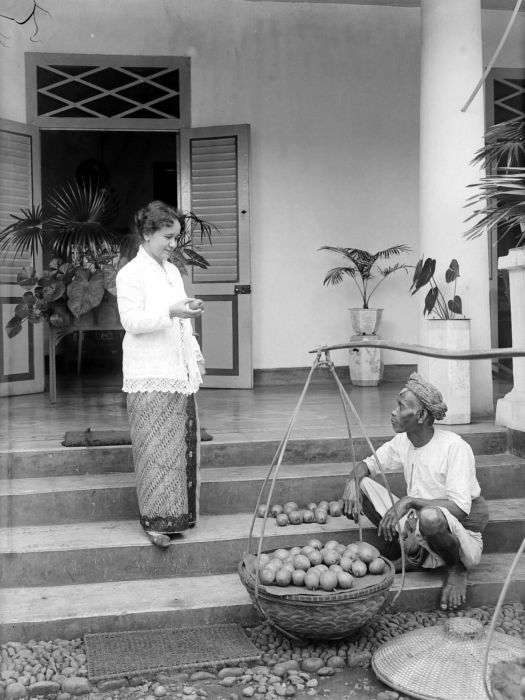
European woman in sarong and kebaya, early 20th century

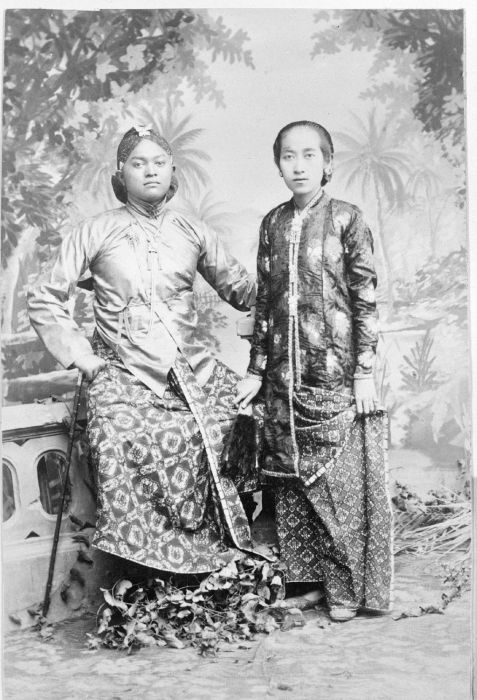
Raden Tumenggung Sosronegoro with his wife, a daughter of the Sultan HB VI of Yogyakarta (c. 1860–1892)

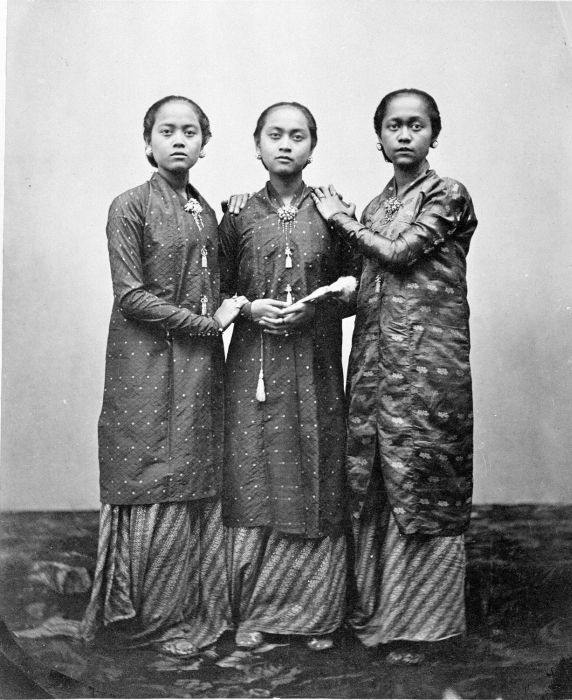
Three daughters of Sultan HB VI of Yogyakarta, circa 1870

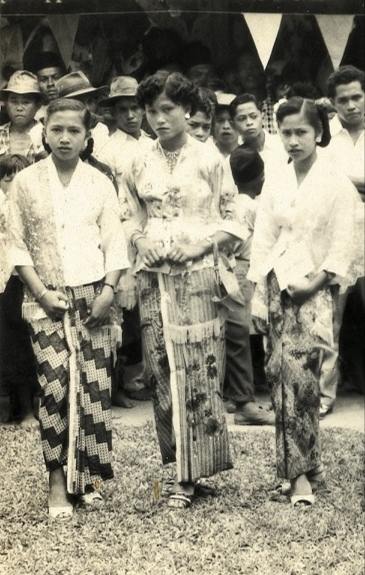
Three Bruneian Malay women in traditional kebaya and sarongs in Sandakan District, British North Borneo, c. 1920s–1930s

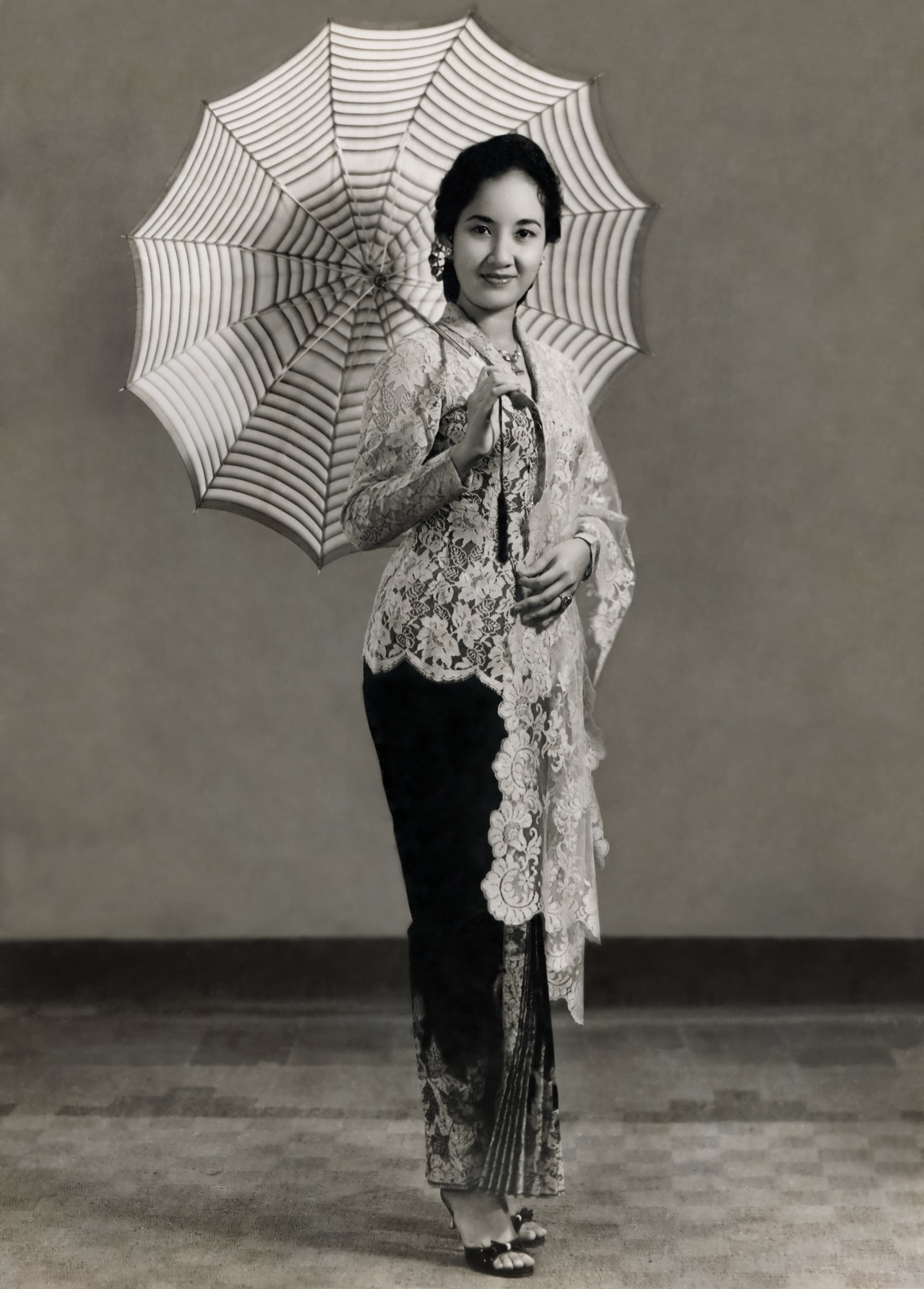
Indonesian movie star Chitra Dewi in kebaya (c. 1960)

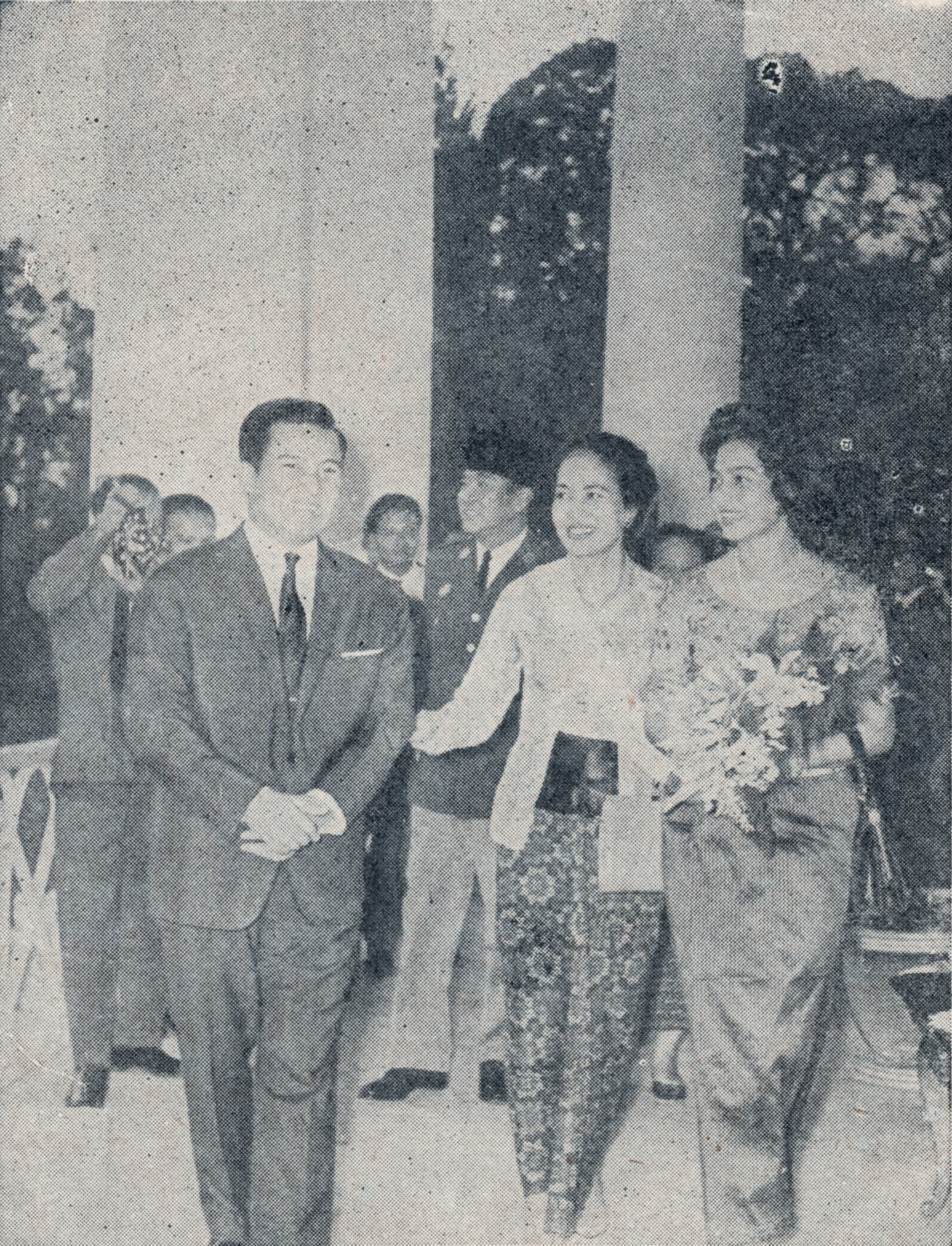
Hartini Sukarno in kebaya welcoming Cambodian royal couple Sihanouk and Monineath (1964)

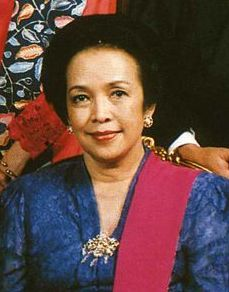
Former Indonesian first lady Ainun Habibie in blue Javanese kebaya (1998)

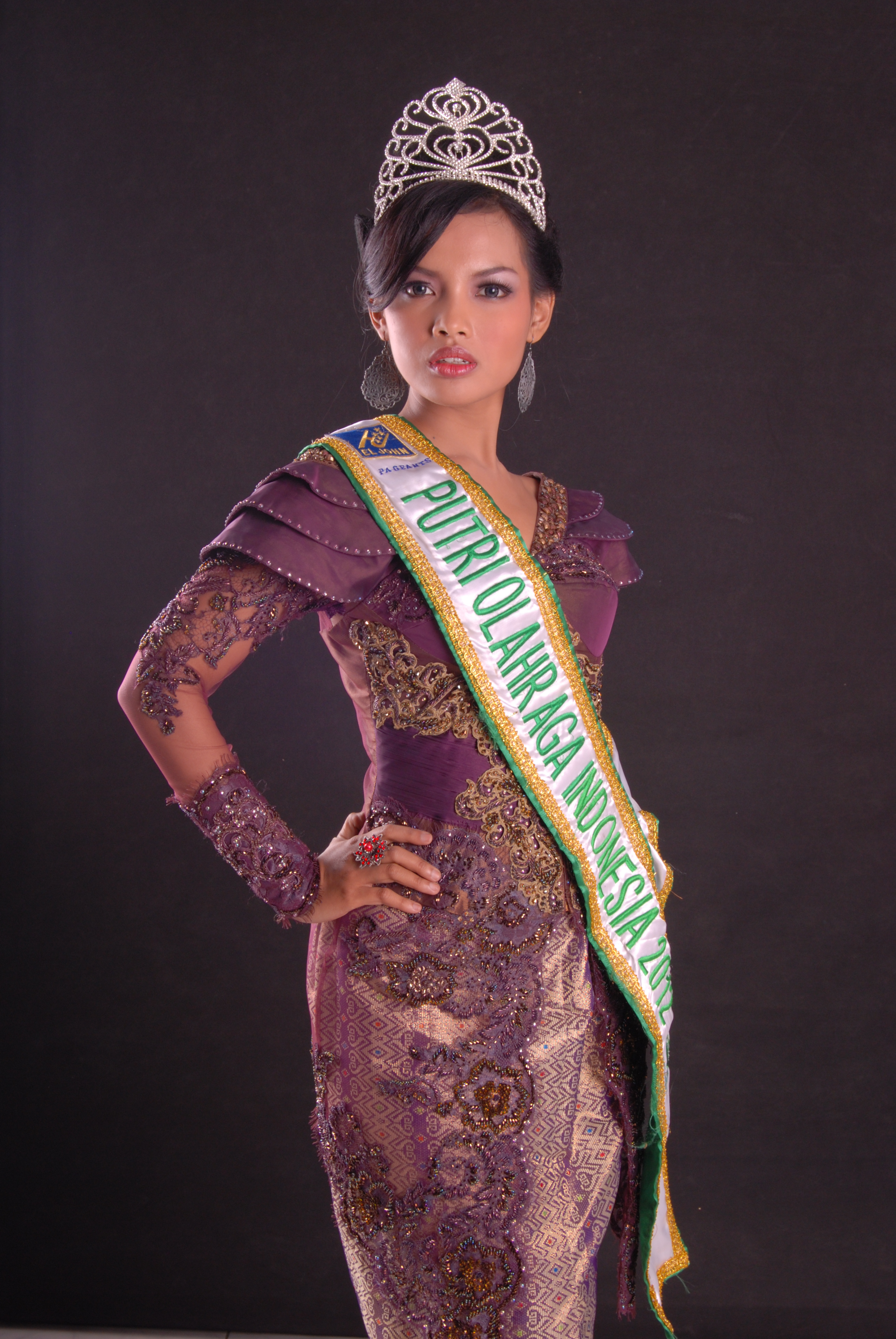
Kebaya as national attire representing Indonesia in a beauty pageant (2012)

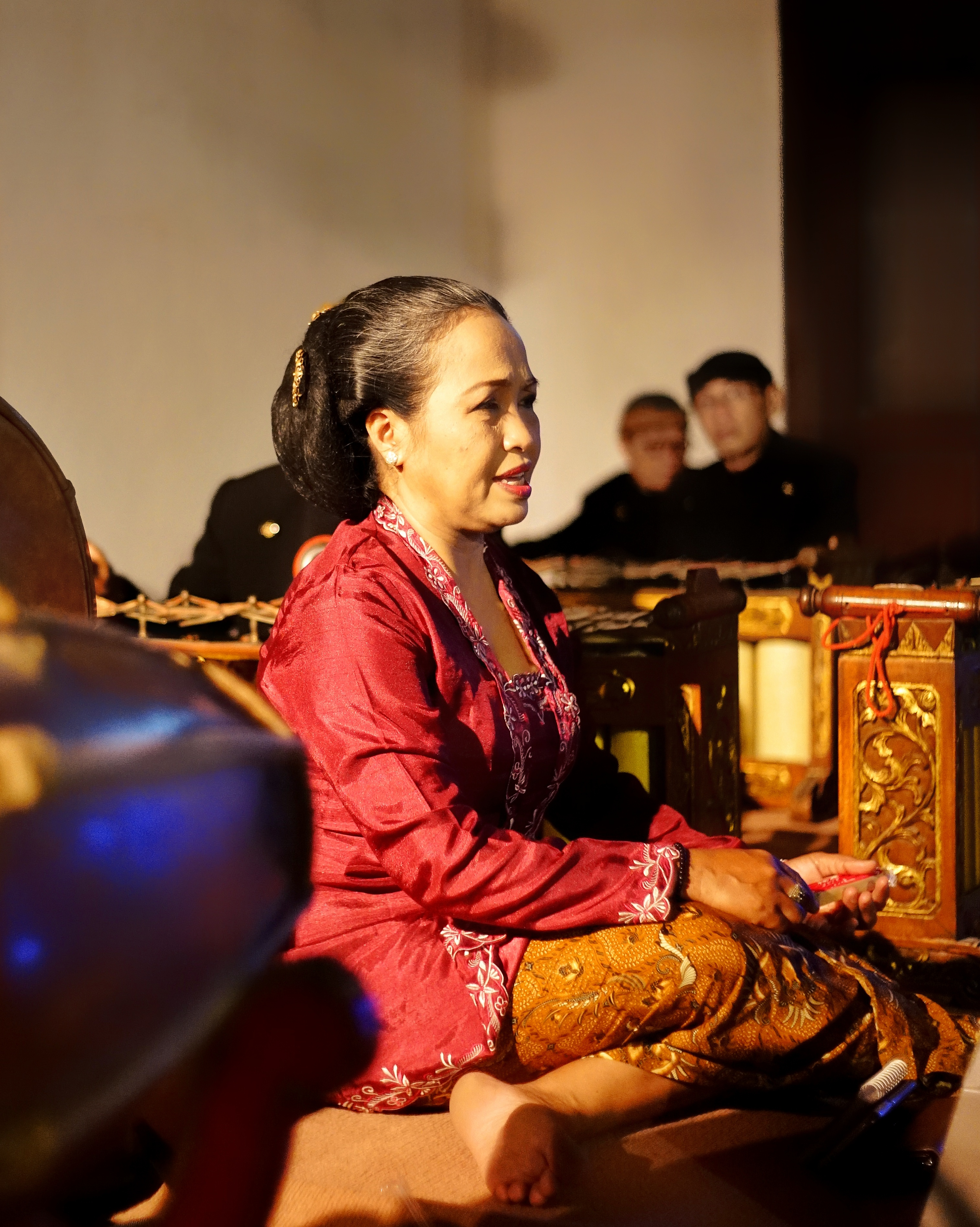
A sindhen wearing kebaya in Javanese singing performance

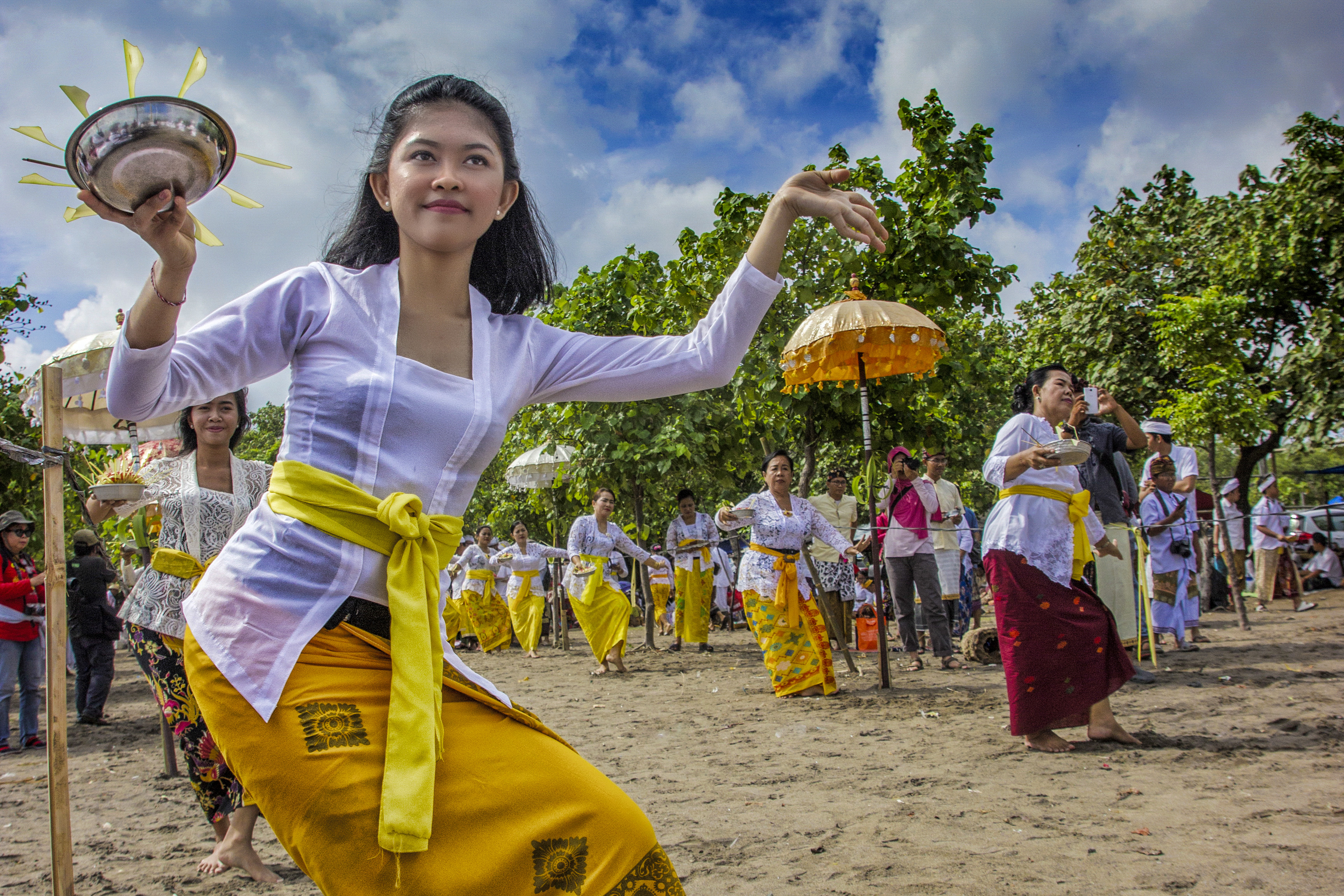
Balinese women wearing kebaya in Melasti ritual ceremony, a self-purification ceremony to welcome Nyepi by all Hindus in Bali

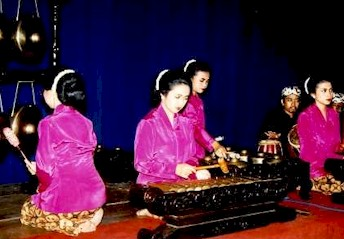
Sundanese Gamelan musicians wearing kebaya from West Java, Indonesia

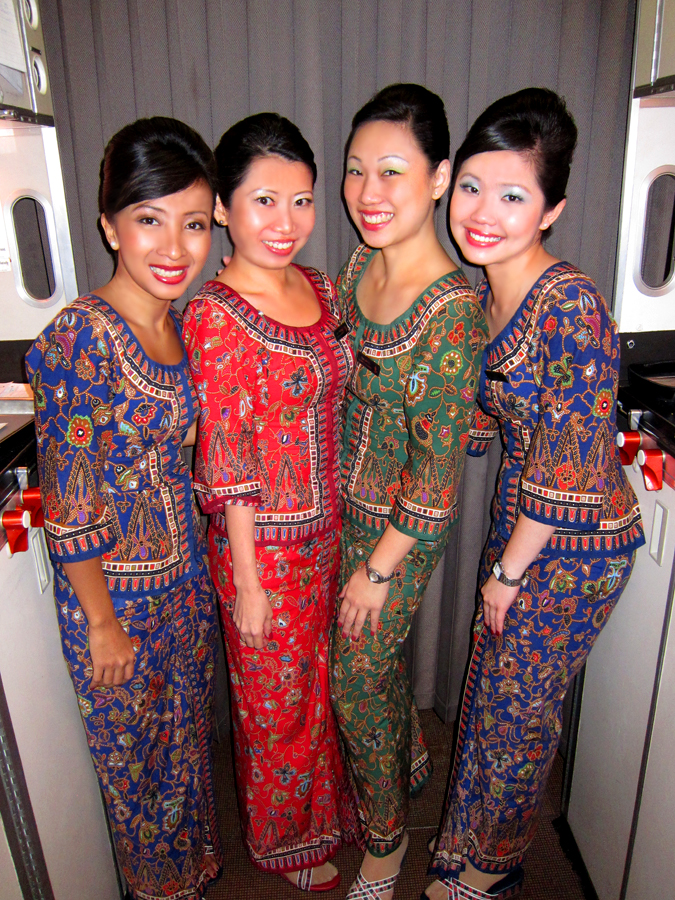
A group of Singapore Airlines flight attendants. The colour of their sarong kebaya represents different ranks.

Cosplay of Wikipe-tan in a kebaya for the Wikimedia Malaysia booth during the 2023 NOiZUcon at the Kuala Lumpur Convention Centre

Media related to Kebaya at Wikimedia Commons
Media related to Tropenmuseum at Wikimedia Commons

== See also ==
- National costume of Indonesia
- Culture of Indonesia
- Culture of Malaysia
- Culture of Singapore
- Culture of Thailand
- Javanese culture
- List of Intangible Cultural Heritage elements in Malaysia
- List of Intangible Cultural Heritage elements in Indonesia
- List of Intangible Cultural Heritage elements in Thailand
- Htaingmathein
