= Obin (designer) =

Indonesian textile designer

- Born: Josephine Werratie Komara; 1955 (age 69–70); Indonesia
- Occupation(s): Textile and fashion designer
- Known for: Batik and other traditional Indonesian textiles.
- Spouse: Roni Siswandi (d.2013)
- Website: http://www.binhouse.com

Obin, real name Josephine Komara, is a textile designer from Indonesia. She is sometimes called a "national treasure" due to her passion for and promotion of traditional Indonesian batik techniques. Her work has achieved worldwide recognition, with fellow Indonesian designers such as Edward Hutabarat (himself credited with the batik revival) and Ghea Panggabean describing her as the real authority and leader of the mid-2000s movement to update and modernise batik. Despite this, Obin describes herself as simply a tukang kain, or vendor of cloth, stating that the genuine artists and designers are the craftsmen who make the textiles retailed through Bin House, her business.

== Personal life and education ==
Born in Indonesia in 1955, Josephine Werratie Komara went to school in Hong Kong until she finished elementary school and then returned home, aged 14. Until his death in 2013, Obin was married to an archaeologist and anthropologist named Roni Siswandi; they have one son, Erlangga (called 'Erlang'). She is a self-taught textile designer who has never formally studied the subject, but taught herself through collecting, handling and examining fabrics, and seeing them made.

== Business history ==
Obin started out in the 1970s, whilst Indonesia was a developing country, as a vendor of furnishing fabrics, selling raw silks for lampshades and upholstery. In the early 1980s she began to sell ikat-woven textiles, including shirts, using her research and knowledge of traditional fabrics to promote local cloth industries.

In 1985, while going over the antique batiks and textiles she had collected since the age of 17, Obin was inspired to explore the crafting techniques that had gone into them, and developed her own hand-weaving and printing methods to enable her to create her own original fabrics. She also questioned why, despite her love for traditional textiles and cloths, there were no new patterns and designs. Through combining brand new motifs with traditional weaving techniques and methods using softer threads to create fabrics that could be batiked, Obin created completely unique yet totally Indonesian fabrics that did not rely on imported cotton and chiffons.

In 1986, Obin opened her first Bin House showroom in Menteng, an upper class area of Jakarta. In 1989 she opened her first boutique in Japan. By 2001, in addition to several Japanese outlets, there were Bin House galleries in Bali and Singapore along with the Menteng establishment. There is also a retail outlet in the Netherlands.

By 2012, Obin employed over 1,000 artisan workers to completely hand-create her fabrics, many of whom had passed their skills down through the generations. In addition to Japan, Singapore and Bali, Obin textiles are bought by traders and resold in Europe, Australia, the Middle East, and the United States, where her work is more desirable than equivalent pieces from Vietnam or Thailand. Due to their handcrafted nature, no two Obin pieces are identical.

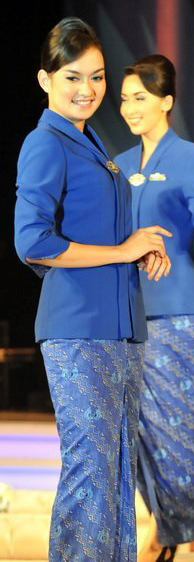
Flight attendant uniforms for Garuda Indonesia designed in 2010

In 2010 Obin helped design uniforms made from traditional cloth for staff and cabin crew at Garuda, the national airline of Indonesia. Although the kebaya-style blouse and skirt uniforms feature a traditional yet updated parang gondosuli batik design incorporating jasmine and garuda wings, these are printed rather than authentic wax-resist batik in order to ensure uniformity.

By 2012, Obin's batiks were compared to designer handbags, with her shawls being worn by fashionable women to cocktail parties. Previously, batik had been considered a dark, heavy and old-fashioned fabric that was only worn by politicians and their wives to formal functions, but due to the work of Obin and Edward Hutabarat, it had become a desirable and fashionable fabric.

== Textile heritage ==
Preserving the traditional skills and techniques of Indonesian textile production is extremely important to Obin, who describes the textiles produced under her name as "works of life", rather than works of art. In some cases, exceptionally elaborate batiks can take up to a year and a half to complete, which means that the end product is expensive, but it is more important to Obin that her workers receive appropriate payment and appreciation of their skills. Obin prefers to avoid cutting into her textiles, making them into sarongs and shawls so that their patterns are kept intact. Sometimes she asks buyers not to cut the fabrics, but instead to appreciate their craftsmanship, artistry and heritage techniques. She has said "Batik is our heritage and we must preserve it."

In October 2009, UNESCO recognised batik as an important part of Indonesia's heritage, naming it part of the world's "intangible cultural heritage". This designation was controversial with some Malaysians taking offence and claiming that batik was as much part of their heritage as Indonesia's, although Indonesian designers such as Hutabarat, Obin and Sanchia Hamidjaja were cited as major players in the batik revival of a few years earlier, which combined contemporary updates with heritage technique.

== Museums ==
Obin's textiles are held by the Powerhouse Museum in Sydney, Australia, and institutions in Amsterdam and Japan. In 2010, the Korea Foundation hosted Wearable Art: Indonesian Batik Cloth, an exhibition of Bin House textiles, which was the first time that Korea had held such an exhibition.

=== Museum Kain ===
In a BBC interview in 2012, Obin stated her intention of opening a textile museum in Bali in 2013. Museum Kain (literally, "cloth museum") formally opened on 20 November 2013 in the Beachwalk shopping mall in Kuta. At the opening ceremony, Obin paid tribute to her late husband, whose idea the museum had been, and to her son, Erlang, who, after his father's death, took control to ensure that the plan went ahead. The museum, which is the first of its kind on the island, is also the first museum in Indonesia to use the latest digital technology such as touchscreens as a way of presenting an authentic collection.
