= Tenun Pahang Diraja =

Style of woven silk fabric from Pahang, Malaysia

Tenun Pahang Diraja (Malay pronunciation: [təˈnun ˈpahaŋ diˈradʒə], تنون ڤهڠ دراج, Royal Pahang Weave; sometimes simply called Tenun Pahang) is a type of woven silk fabric which is famous and popular in the state of Pahang, Malaysia.

== History of Tenun Pahang Diraja ==
Silk weaving in Pahang originated from the Makassar descent. When the Dutch conquered Macassar Island, they sought refuge in the Riau Islands of Indonesia and later they migrated to Pahang to avoid the fighting and war in Riau.

A high official of the Macassar, known as Tuk Tuan Keraing Aji, was one of those refugees who came to Pahang in 1722 and he settled at Kampung Mengkasar, Pekan. Not only was he a master weaver and fully conversant and truly knowledgeable in silk weaving, he was also a connoisseur of fine fabrics and clothing, having collected fine fabrics and clothes from various parts of Indonesia.

As a master weaver extraordinaire, he was regarded as a pioneer of new designs and patterns for kain sampin and kain sarong. He taught silk weaving and the various processes to many of the womenfolk of the village including the surrounding areas. But more importantly, he contributed towards the creations of new patterns and designs for the fabrics. In time this unique silk weaving industry flourished in Pekan and its high quality and designs especially known far and wide and "branded" as it were, as Tenun Pahang.

Tuk Tuan Keraing Aji was buried at the Islamic Cemetery in Kampung Mengkasar, (the grave can be seen there). The students he taught in Pekan continued his work of teaching the weaving techniques and processes to their generations, and the transmission of knowledge continued until now, encouraged by the Pahang state government by the establishment of the Kompleks Budaya Pulau Keladi.

Intan suh tgk keladi

As the most famous woven silk in Pahang, Tenun Pahang was conferred royal status "Diraja" by HH Tengku Abdullah Sultan Ahmad Shah, the crown prince of Pahang on 8 May 2006.

In fact even today, the mesin kek, the special machine to weave the Tenun Pahang Diraja, can still be found in most homes in the village, and men and women of the village, young and old, continue to carry out weaving activities during their spare time.

== See also ==
- Tenun
- Songket
