= National costume of Indonesia =

Indonesian clothing

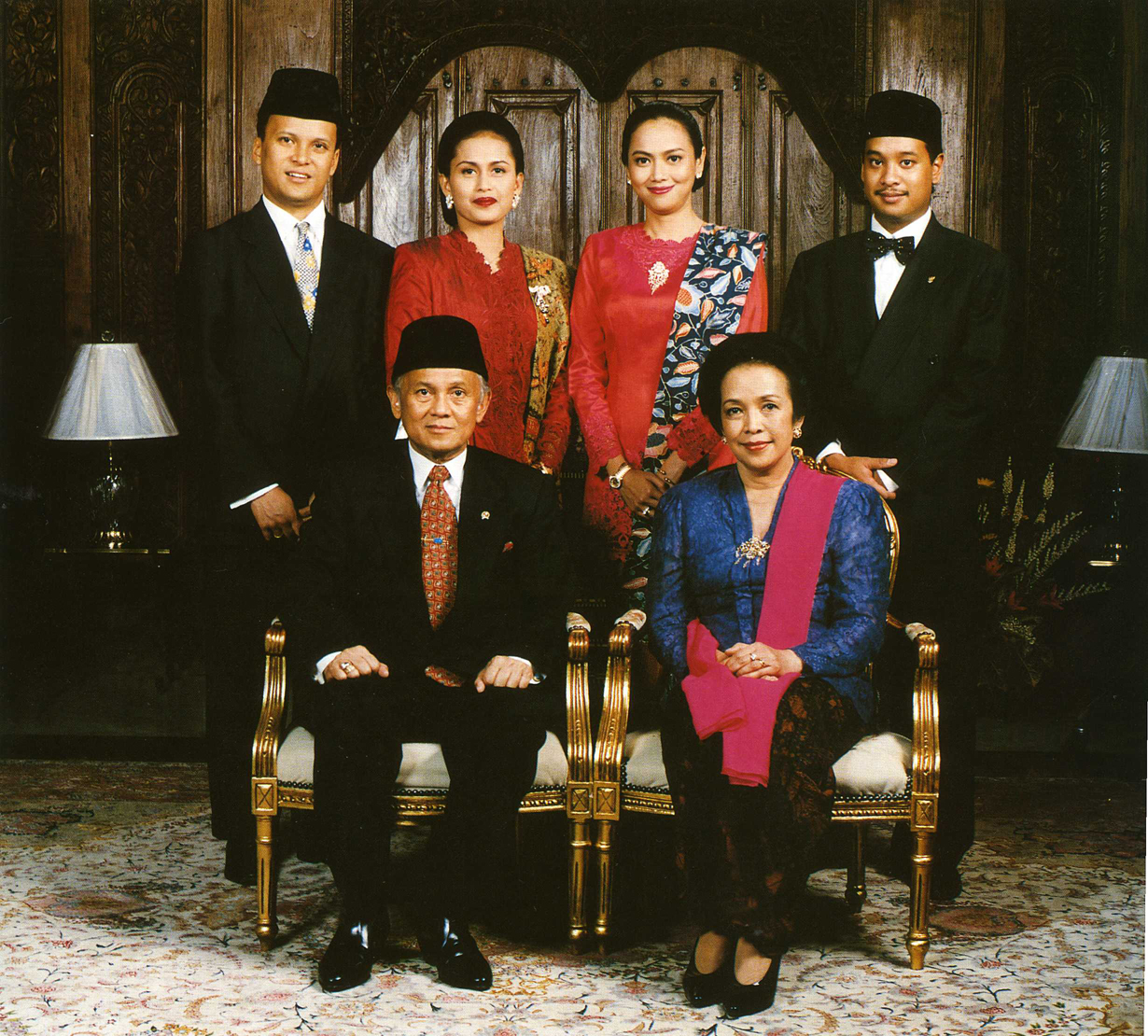
Formal family portrait of former Indonesian's President B.J. Habibie. Women wear kain batik and kebaya with selendang (sash), while men wear jas and dasi (western suit with tie) with peci cap.

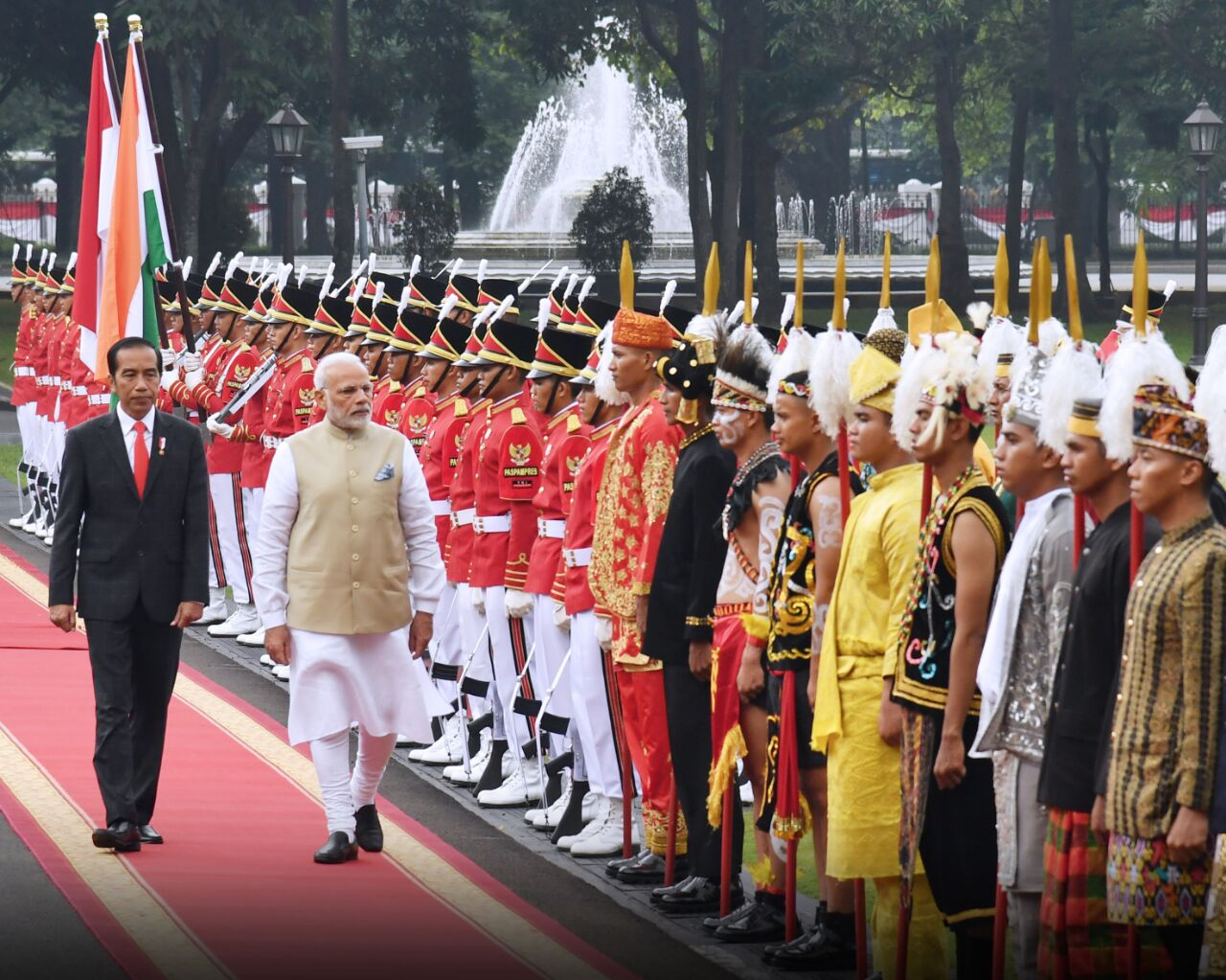
Indian Prime Minister Narendra Modi inspects guard of honor wearing traditional clothing of Indonesia at Merdeka Palace, Jakarta

The national costume of Indonesia (Indonesian: Pakaian Nasional Indonesia) is the national attire that represents the Republic of Indonesia. It is derived from Indonesian culture and Indonesian traditional textile traditions. Today the most widely recognized Indonesian national attires include batik and kebaya, although originally those attires mainly belong within the island of Java and Bali, most prominently within Javanese, Sundanese and Balinese culture. Since Java has been the political and population center of Indonesia, folk attire from the island has become elevated into national status.

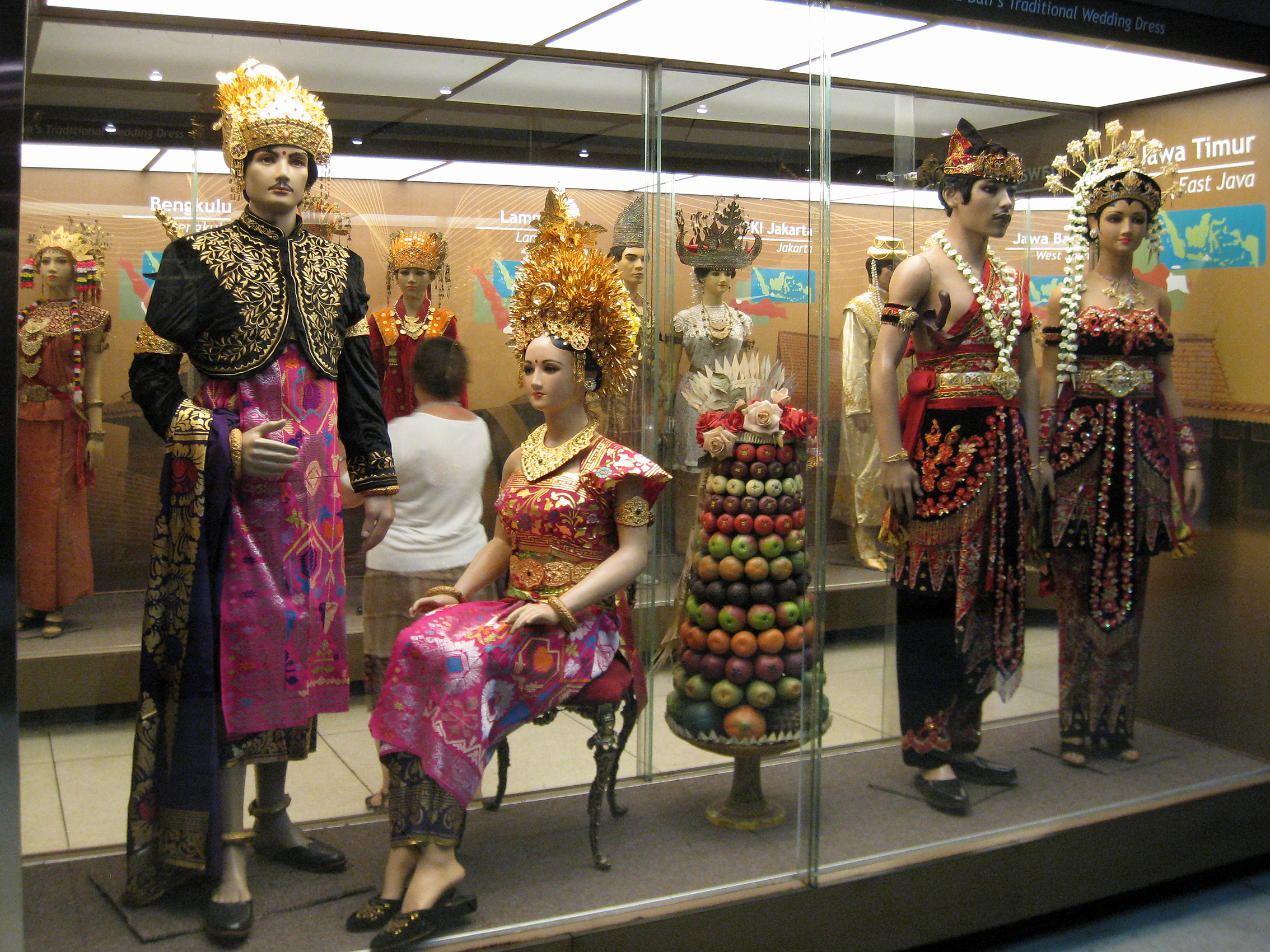
Indonesia Museum depicting traditional dresses of Indonesia. The picture shows the traditional wedding dress of Bali (left) and East Java (right) with other dresses from other provinces depicted in the background

As a multi-diverse country, Indonesia having more than 30 provinces, each has its own representation of traditional attire and dress from each province with its own unique and distinguished designs.

National attires are worn during official occasions as well as traditional ceremonies. The most obvious display of Indonesian national attires can be seen by the type of attires worn by the President of Indonesia and the Indonesian first lady in many and different types of occasions and settings, and also worn by Indonesian diplomatic officials during gala dinners. Traditional weddings and formal ceremonies in Indonesia are important occasions in the country where the wear of Indonesia national attires are absolutely visible ranging from traditional to modern attires different from each region they are representing.

== National attires ==
=== Batik ===
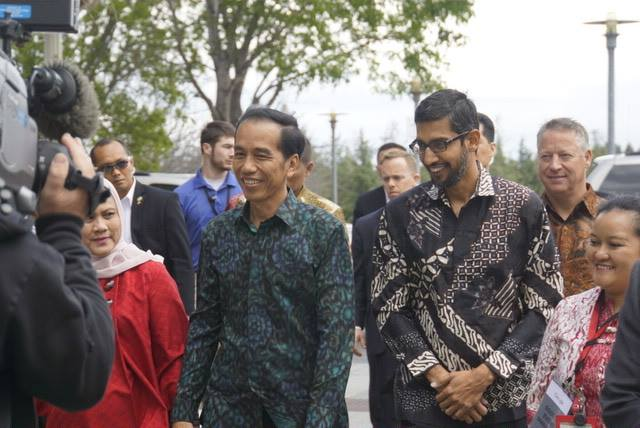
The batik shirt for men is often considered as an Indonesian national attire, as worn here by Indonesian President Joko Widodo (left) and Google CEO Sundar Pichai.

Batik is a cloth that is traditionally made using a manual wax-resist dyeing technique to form intricate patterns. Traditionally batik cloth is a large piece of intricately decorated cloth used by Javanese women as kemben or torso wrap. Batik cloth were wrapped around the hips with multiple folds in front called wiron, while the upper torso wear kebaya fitted dress. Traditionally for men, the edge of batik cloth also can be sewn together to make a tubular cloth as sarong, or wrapped around hips as kain in fashion similar to women's. Later for men, the batik cloth also sewn and made into contemporary batik men's shirt.

Batik is recognized as one of the important identity of Indonesian culture. UNESCO designated Indonesian batik as a Masterpiece of Oral and Intangible Heritage of Humanity on October 2, 2009. As part of the acknowledgment, UNESCO insisted that Indonesia preserve their heritage.

Batik shirts, which are commonly worn by men in Indonesia (especially in Java), are usually worn during formal occasions; such as attending weddings, traditional ceremonies, formal meetings, communal gatherings, etc. Sometimes men who wear batik shirt usually also wearing a songkok or peci cap to make it more formal in a traditional way. Batik shirts have two types of cuts: long sleeves for formal occasions, and short sleeves for casual to semi-formal occasions. Batik shirt or blouse are also available for women. Batik pattern differs from region to region, especially across Java and other islands, and have their own motifs or patterns unique to respective local tradition and culture.

=== Kebaya ===
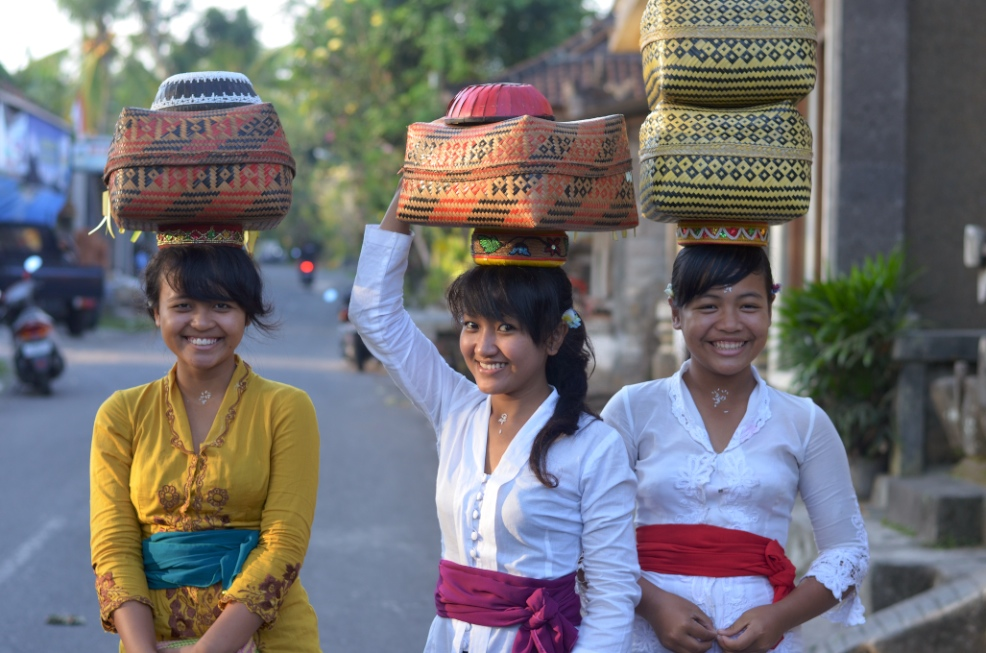
Balinese girls wearing kebaya

The kebaya is the national attire of women from Indonesia, although it is more accurately endemic to the Javanese, Sundanese and Balinese peoples. It is sometimes made from sheer material such as silk, thin cotton or semi-transparent nylon or polyester, adorned with brocade or floral pattern embroidery. Kebaya is usually worn with a sarong or batik kain panjang, or other traditional woven garment such as ikat, songket with a colorful motif.

The earliest form of kebaya originates in the court of the Javanese Majapahit Kingdom as a means to blend the existing female Kemban, torso wrap of the aristocratic women to be more modest and acceptable to the newly adopted Islamic religion. Aceh, Riau and Johor kingdoms and Northern Sumatra adopted the Javanese style kebaya as a means of social expression of status with the more alus or refined Javanese overlords.

Kebaya is usually worn during official national events by the Indonesian first lady, wives of Indonesian diplomats, and Indonesian women in general. It also worn by Indonesian women attending traditional ceremonies and weddings. In Kartini day on 21 April Indonesian women usually wear kebaya to celebrate and honor the Indonesian women emancipation heroine. During Balinese traditional ceremonies, Balinese women wore colorful Balinese style kebaya with songket Bali.

=== Peci ===
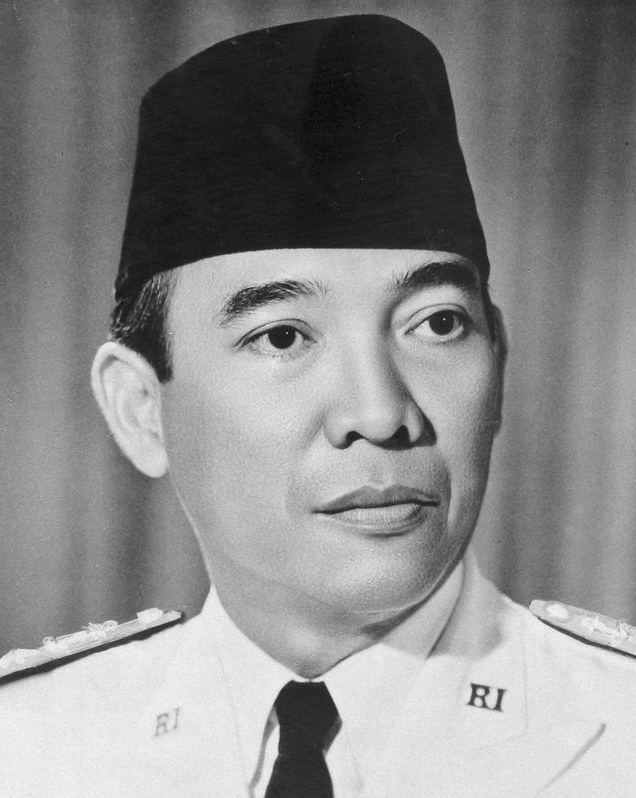
Sukarno wearing black velvet peci

The Peci, also known as songkok or kopiah, is a cap traditionally worn by male Muslims in the Indonesian archipelago. It is quite similar to the Turkish-Egyptian fez. In Indonesia, the black velvet peci has become the national headdress with secular nationalist connotations made popular by Sukarno. A number of Indonesian nationalist movement activists in the early 20th century, such as Sukarno, Muhammad Hatta and Agus Salim, wore a peci to convey their nationalistic sentiments and to demonstrate their Indonesian identity. Indonesian male presidents always wear a peci as part of their official presidential attire.

Since then, the black velvet peci is approved to be the national head-dress for Indonesian men. It is worn all over Indonesia, especially by government officials and men (usually Muslim men) throughout the country. The peci is usually worn with batik shirt or western-style suits by men in Indonesia for those attending formal occasions. It is also commonly worn during Islamic religious occasions. Senior citizen Muslim men across Indonesia — usually in Jakarta who identify themselves as native Betawi people, also use this peci on an everyday basis. It is also a traditional head-dress of the Betawi people and also other ethnic groups, especially in the western parts of Indonesia which are mainly Muslims.

== Regional attires ==
Other than the national attires, each of the provinces of Indonesia — more precisely every ethnic group of Indonesia, have their own regional traditional attires. These regional attires in Indonesian is called baju adat or pakaian adat, and derived from traditional Indonesian textile traditions and crafts. The best chance to see an example of Indonesian traditional attires is by attending a traditional wedding ceremony. The traditional attires differs according to its function and occasion; the most elaborate and extravagant ones usually reserved for bride and groom only, while a more common traditional attires are worn by local people during traditional ceremonies. Some examples of Indonesian regional attires (baju adat) are:

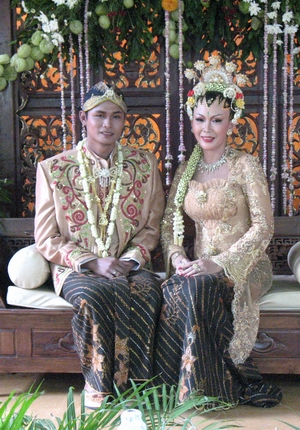
Javanese

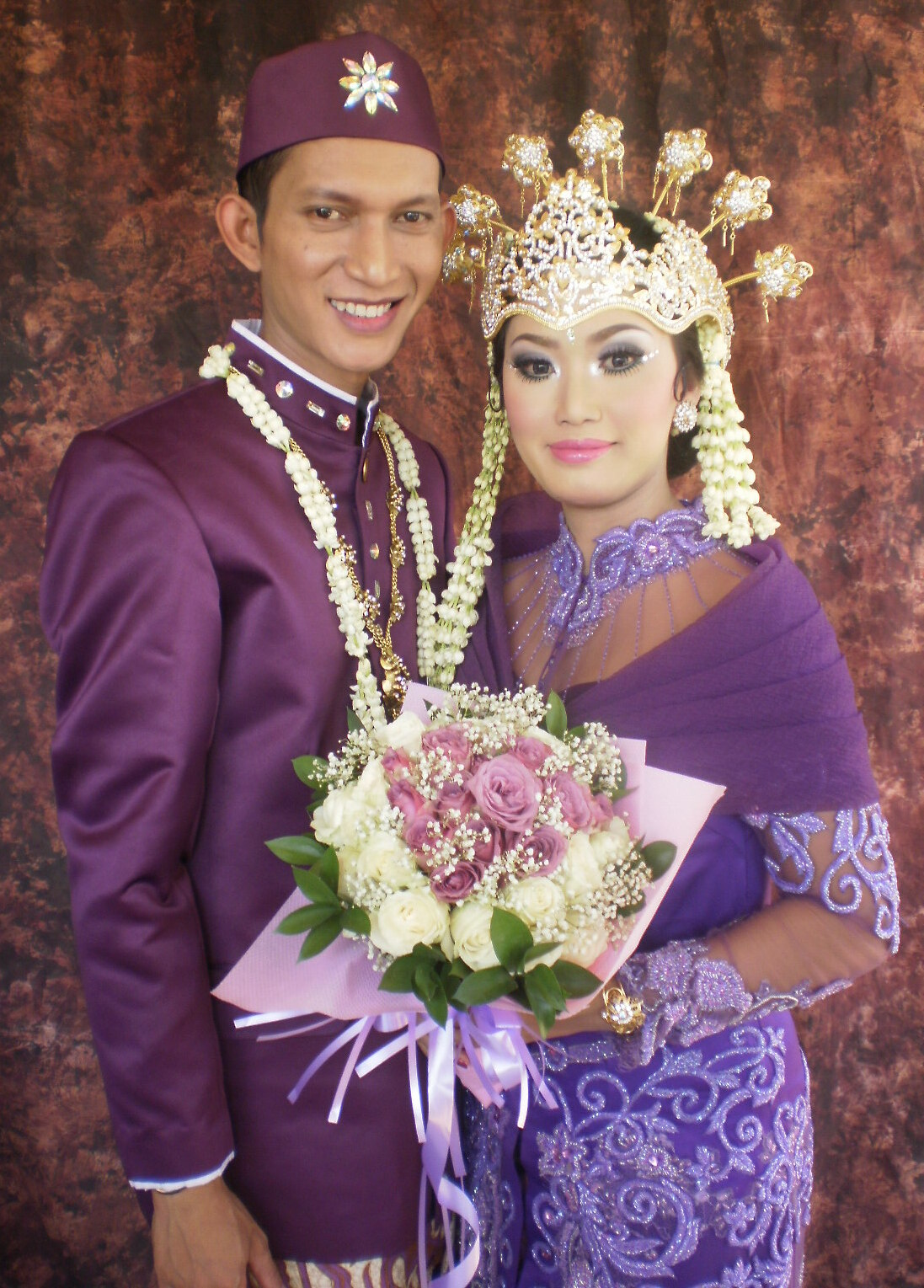
Sundanese

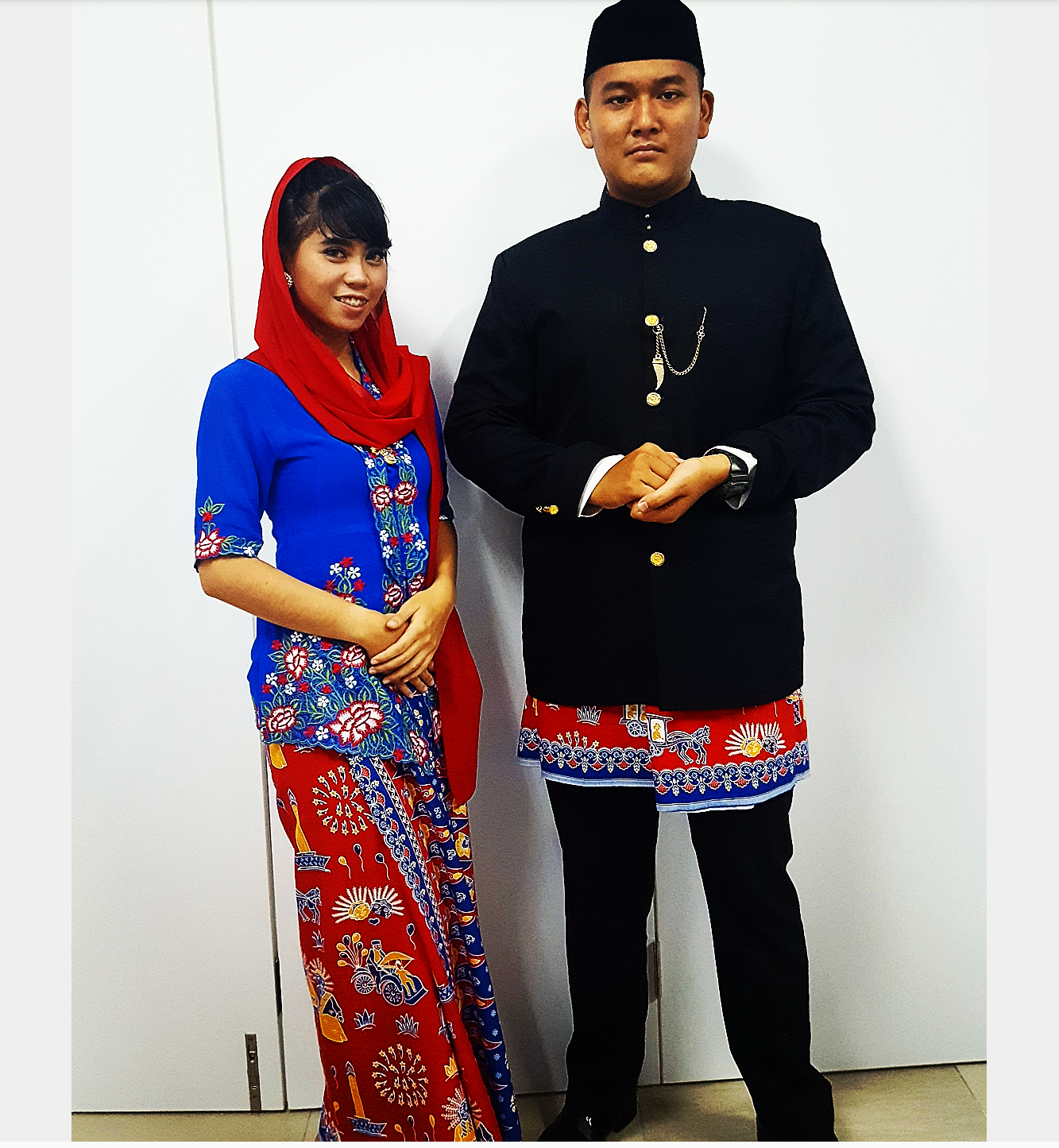
Betawinese

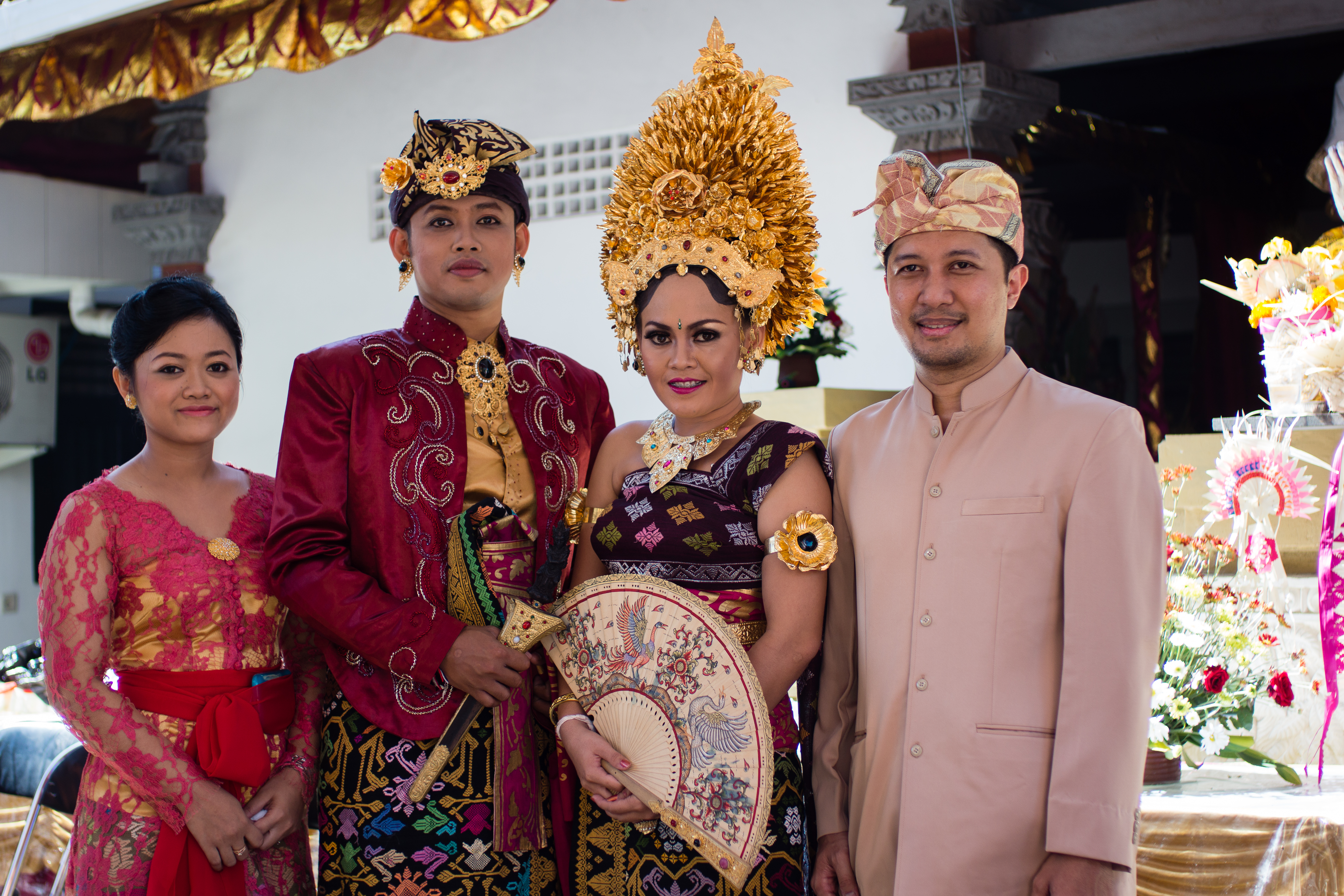
Balinese

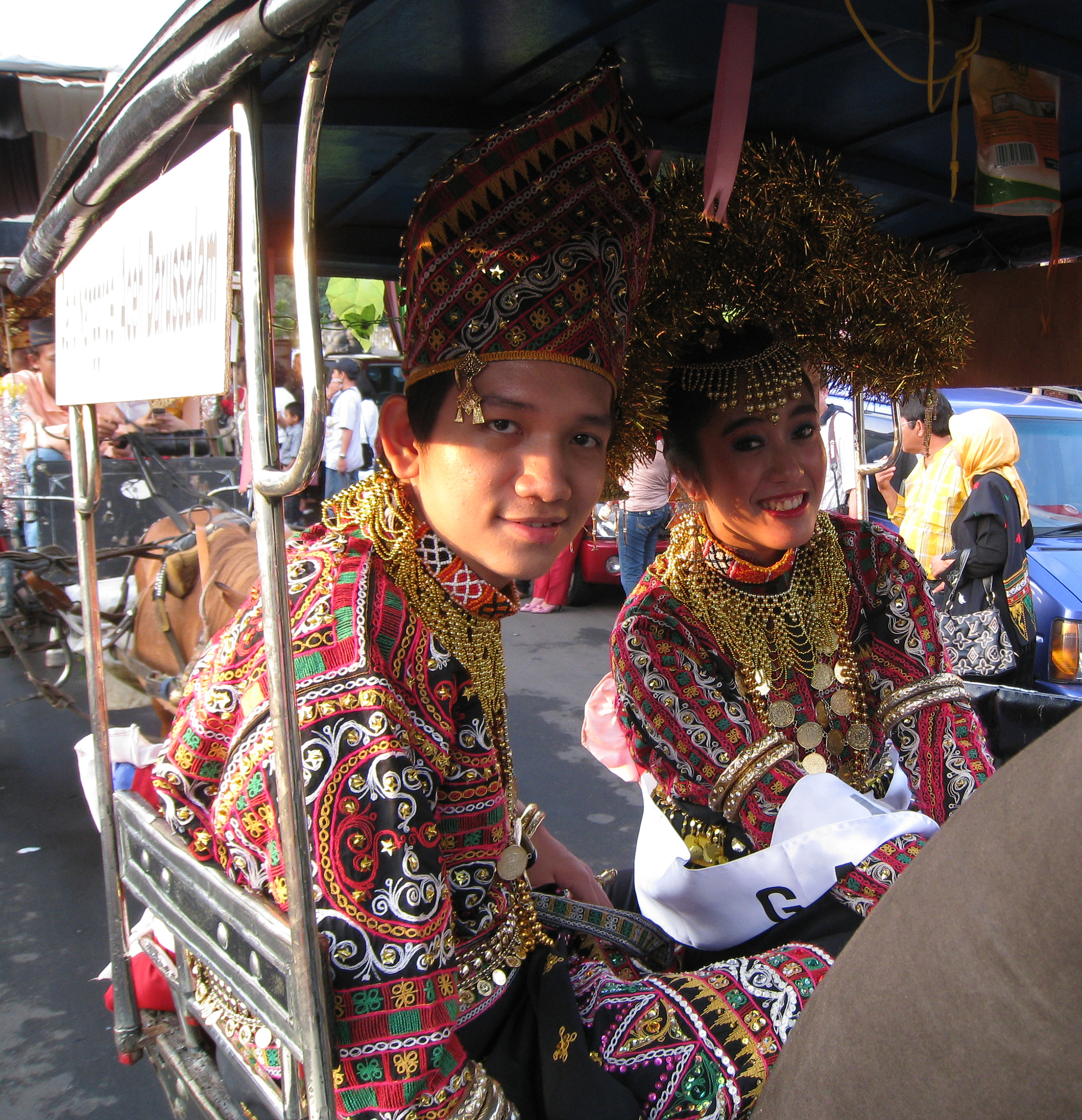
Aceh Gayo

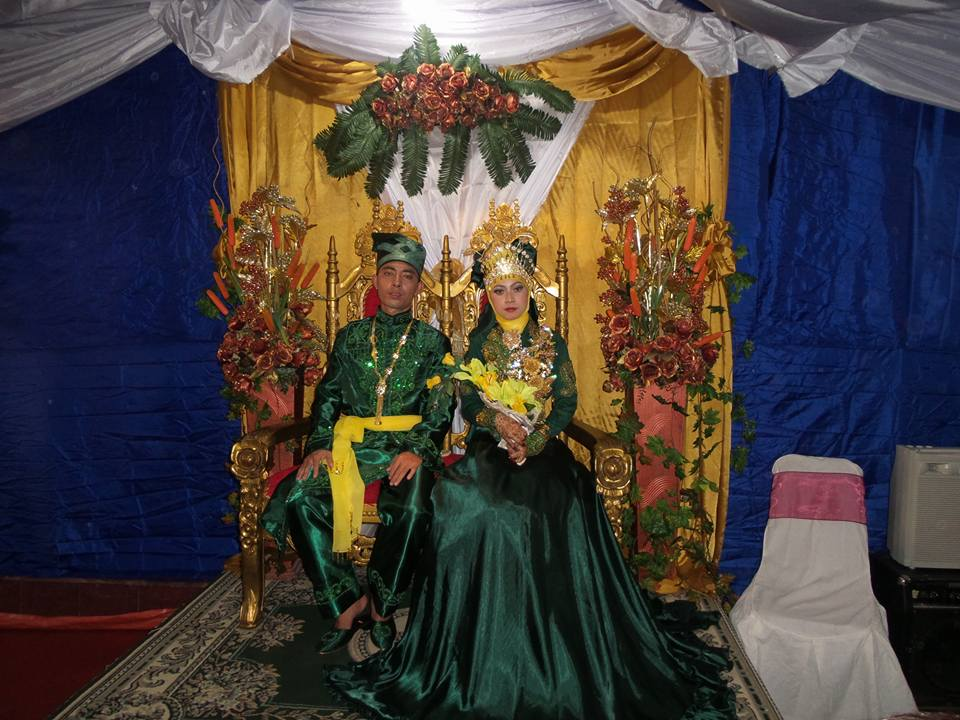
Malay Riau Islands

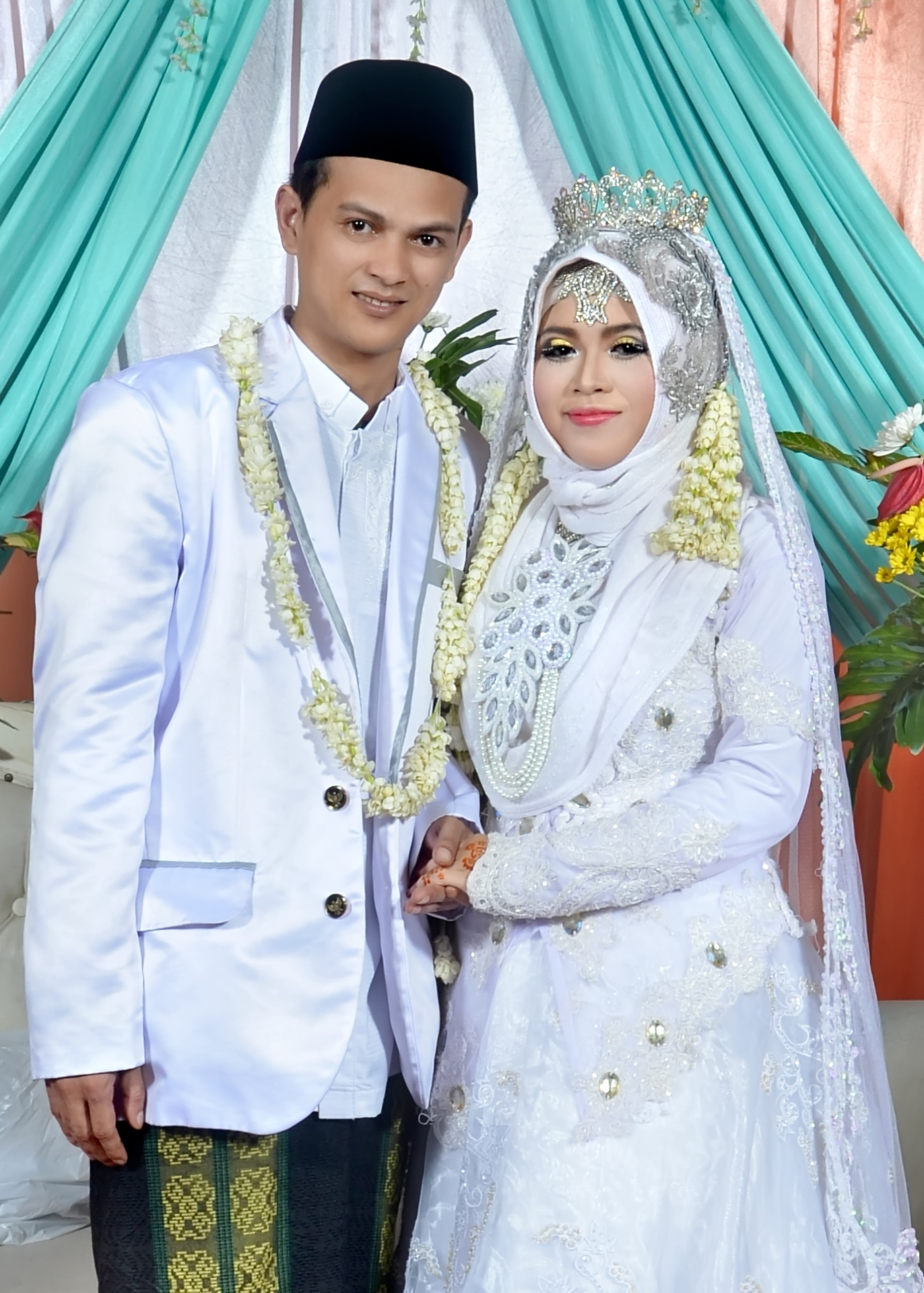
Bantenese

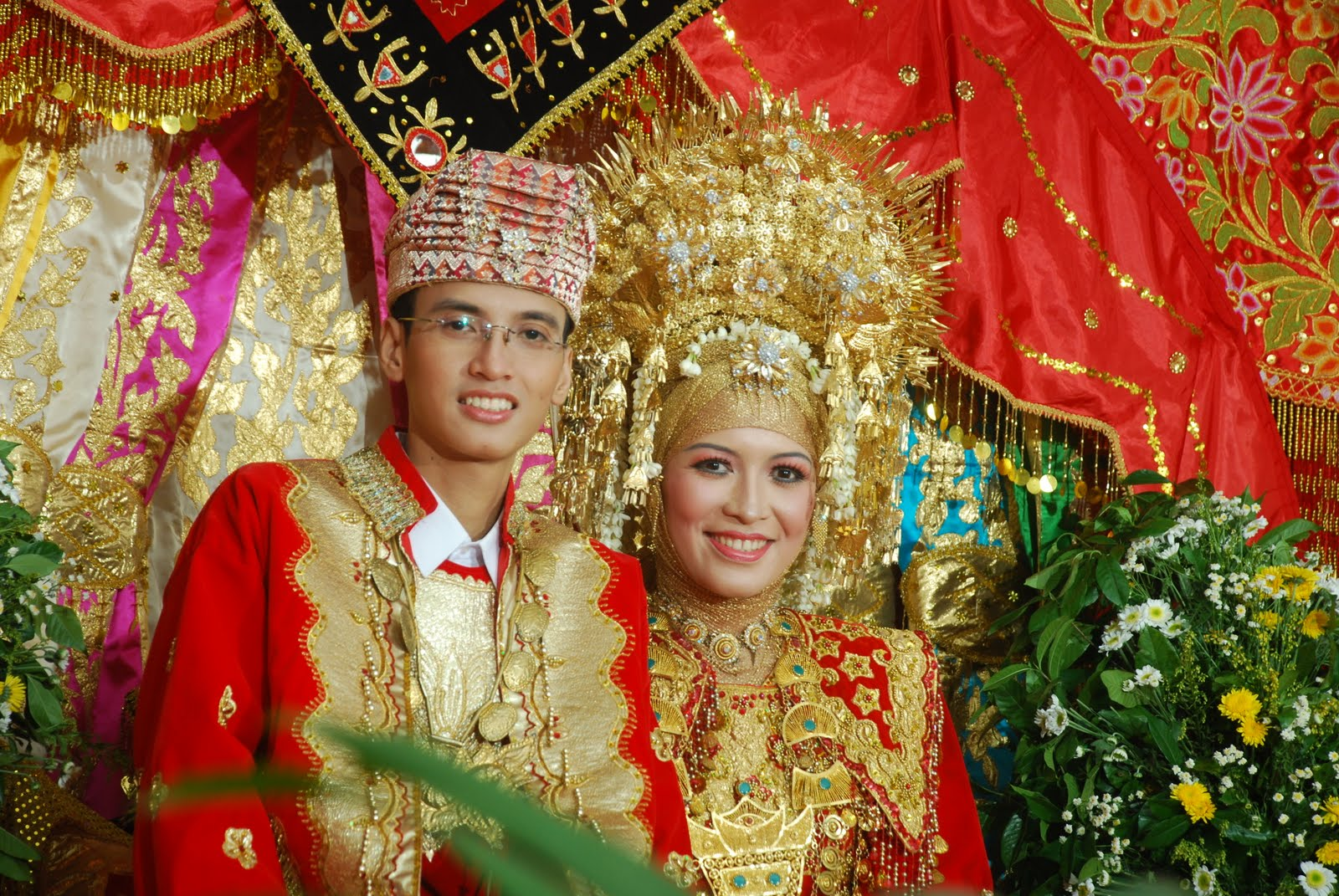
Minangkabau

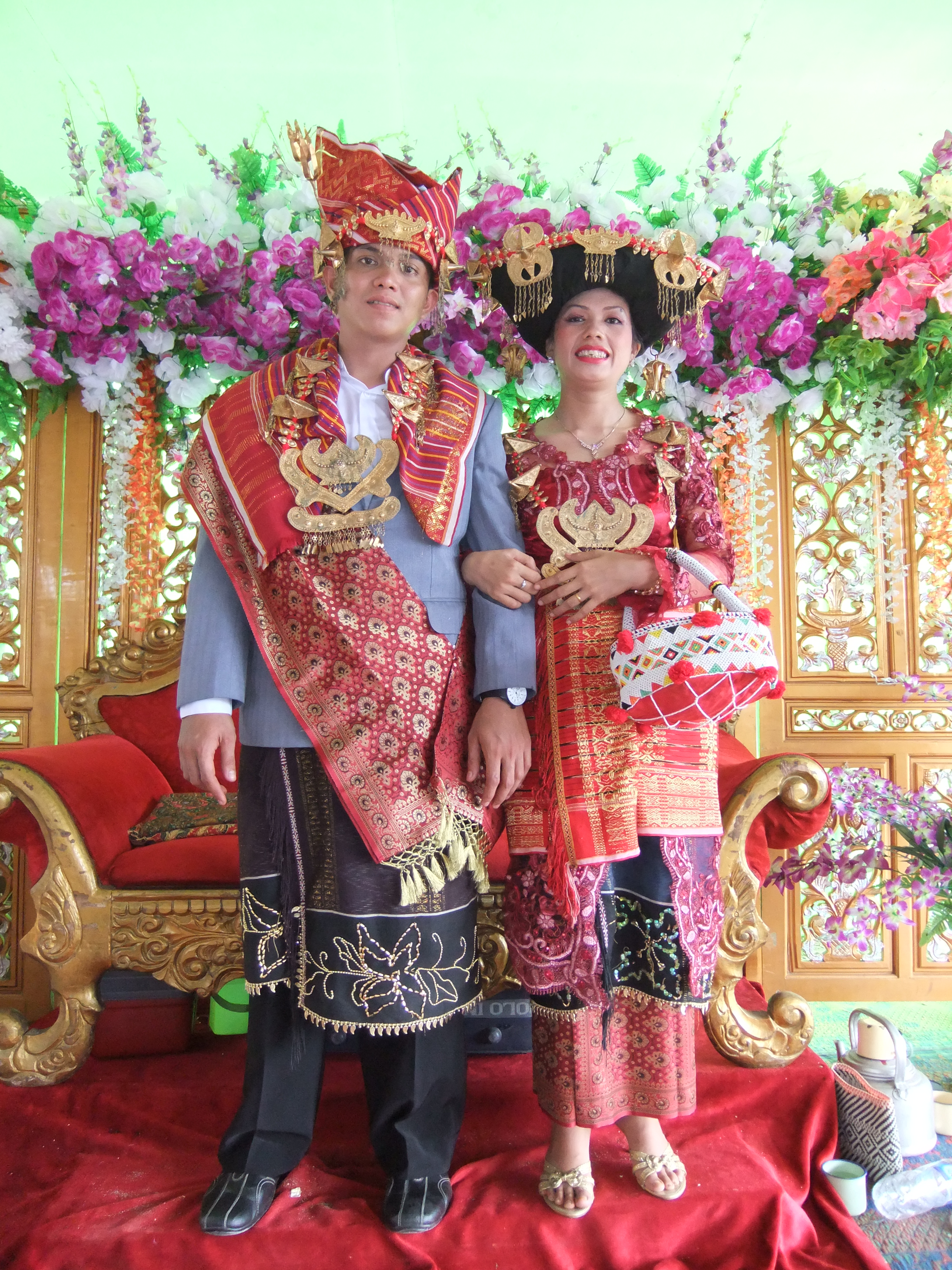
Batak Karo

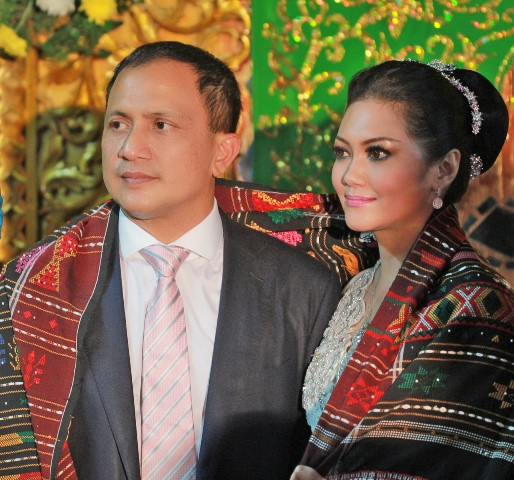
Batak Toba

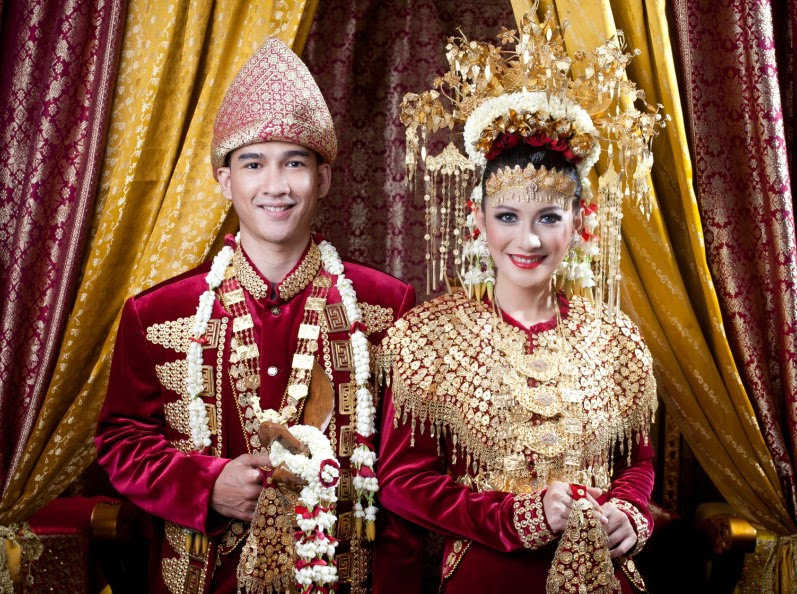
Palembang

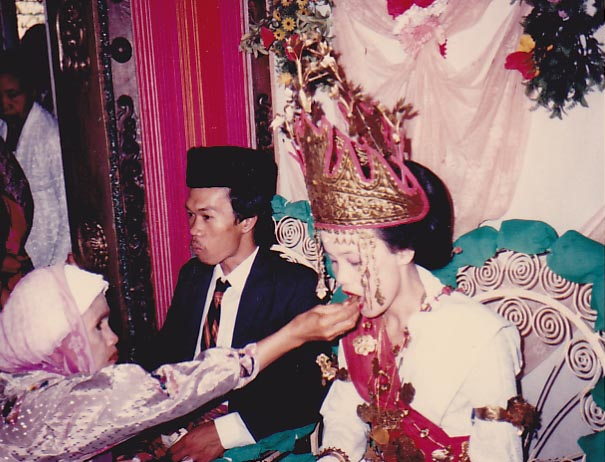
Lampung

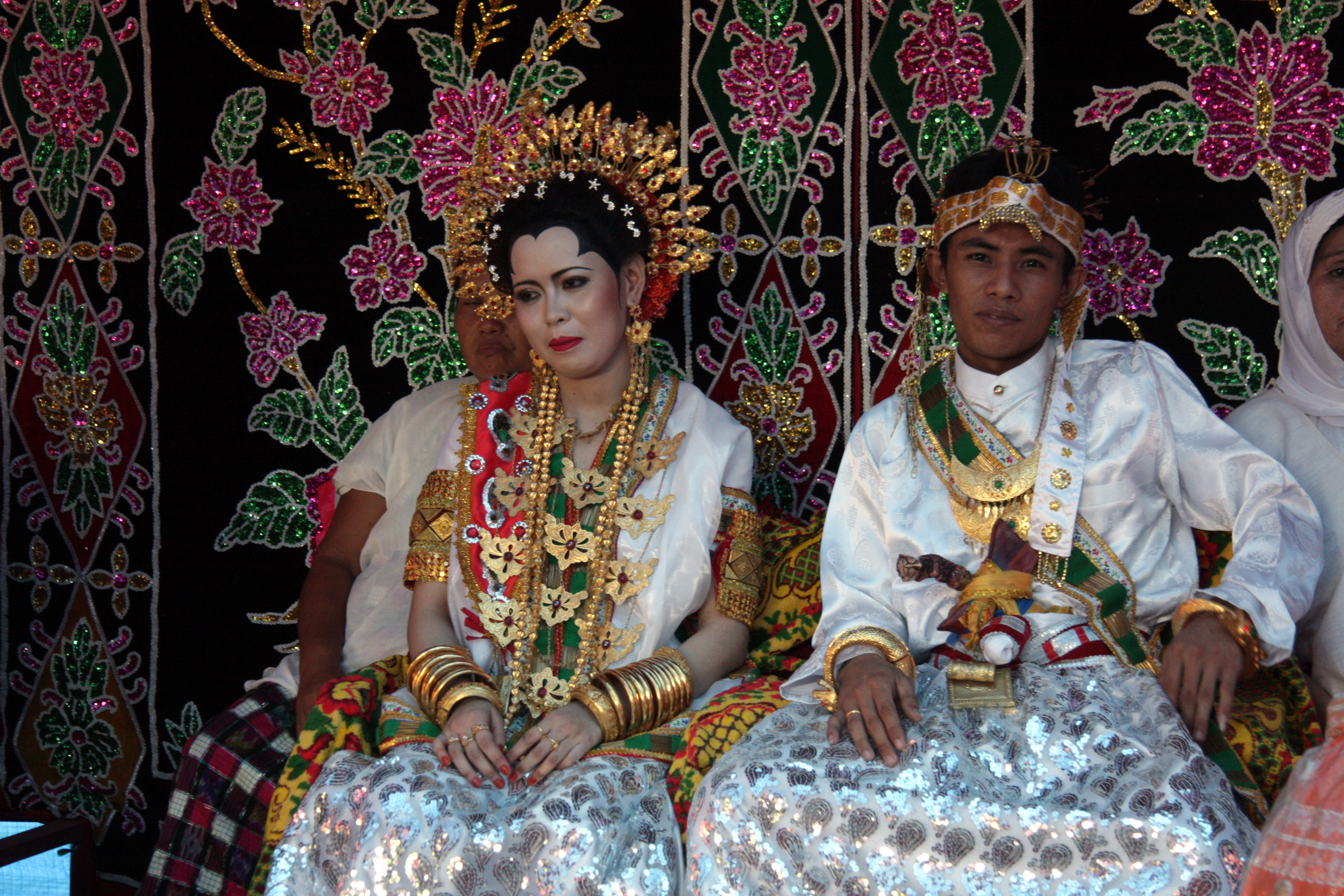
Buginese

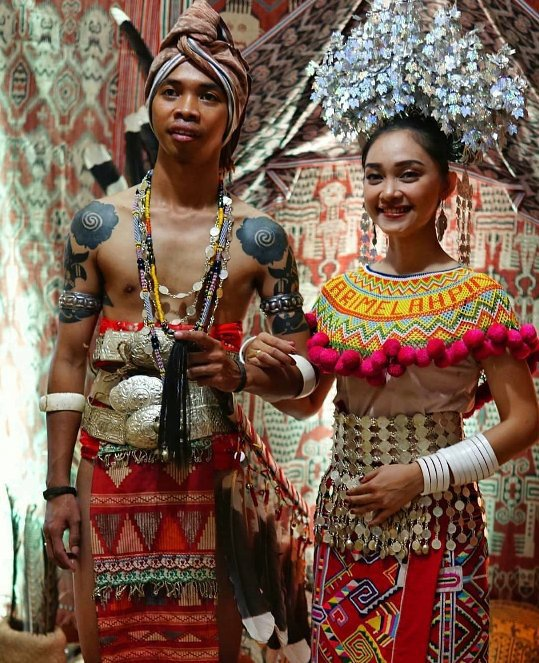
Iban Dayak

=== Textiles ===
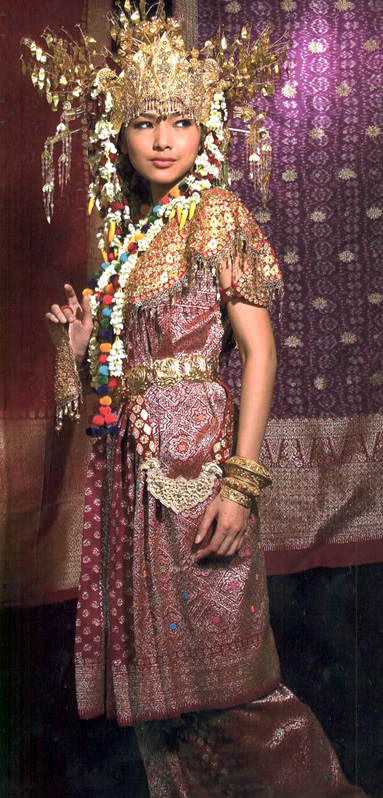
A Palembang lady clad in songket Aesan Gede attire

Stamped batik, the design of which takes months to create; double weave ikat from the islands of Nusa Tenggara, silk Bugis sarong from Sulawesi, gold-painted Balinese prada fabric; shimmering kain songket from Palembang utilizing silver and gold metallic threads weft in woven cotton or silk ikat; and tapis weavings from Lampung. Weavings from the 34 provinces utilize different materials, methods, colors and designs. Primarily formed on back looms, weeks or months are spent creating intricate designs for everyday use or ceremonial wear. These weavings are primarily known by the different techniques that are used to create the distinctive designs.

The symbolism of the various ethnic groups is evident in the variety of textiles. Color, shapes and their arrangements all have special meanings. Certain designs can only be worn by women or men, or only by the members of the royal family or nobility. Special textiles are worn or exchanged in life cycle or rights of passage ceremonies celebrating birth, circumcision, puberty, marriage, childbearing and death. Textiles play an important role in many traditional events and ceremonies.

Written records dating to the fourteenth century document the importance of textiles in the social and religious lives of Indonesians. The highly distinctive traditional dress, or pakaian adat, best shows the diversity of uses of textiles throughout the archipelago. The even more elaborate bridal dress displays the best of each province's textile and ornamental jewelry traditions.

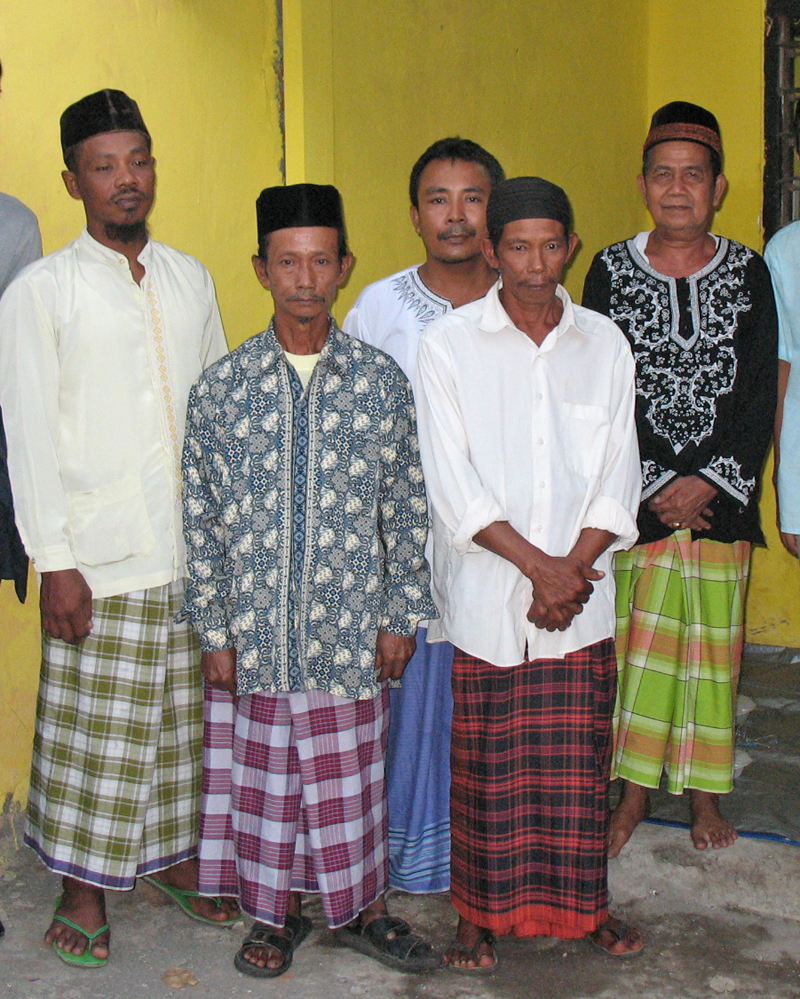
Javanese men often wear sarong with baju koko (koko shirt) or batik shirt and peci during religious or casual occasions.

- Sarong is the most popular waist worn garment in Indonesia mainly worn by men. It is popular among Muslim men across Indonesia and also by other regions and tribes throughout the country. It is mainly worn in Java, Bali, Sumatra, Kalimantan, and other places. It is very similar to the Indian Lungi.
- Songket, a hand-woven in silk or cotton, and intricately patterned with gold or silver threads. In Indonesia, songket is more prevalent in Sumatra and Lesser Sunda Islands (Bali, Lombok and Sumbawa), while in Java, batik is more popular. Various songket patterns are traditionally produced in Sumatra, Kalimantan, Bali, Sulawesi, Lombok and Sumbawa. In Sumatra the famous songket production centers are in Minangkabau Pandai Sikek area, West Sumatra, Jambi City. Jambi and Palembang, South Sumatra. In Bali, songket production villages can be found in Klungkung regency, especially at Sidemen and Gelgel. In the neighboring island of Lombok, the Sukarara village in Jonggat district, Central Lombok regency, is famous for songket making.
- Ikat, a dyeing technique used to pattern textiles that employs a resist dyeing process on the yarns prior to dyeing and weaving the fabric. In Indonesia it is more prevalent in Lesser Sunda Islands, especially in Bali, Sumba, Flores and Timor islands. It is also can be found in Sumatra, Borneo and Sulawesi among Batak, Dayak and Toraja tribes.
- Ulos, a traditionally hand-woven cotton fabrics, and intricately patterned, specific to Batak tribes of North Sumatra, usually slung over the shoulder during traditional occasions.
- Tapis, a traditionally hand-woven fabric, specific to Lampung province on the southern part of Sumatra.
- Tenun, is a generic Indonesian term for "woven". It encompasses a wide array of Indonesian traditional hand woven textiles.

=== Clothing ===
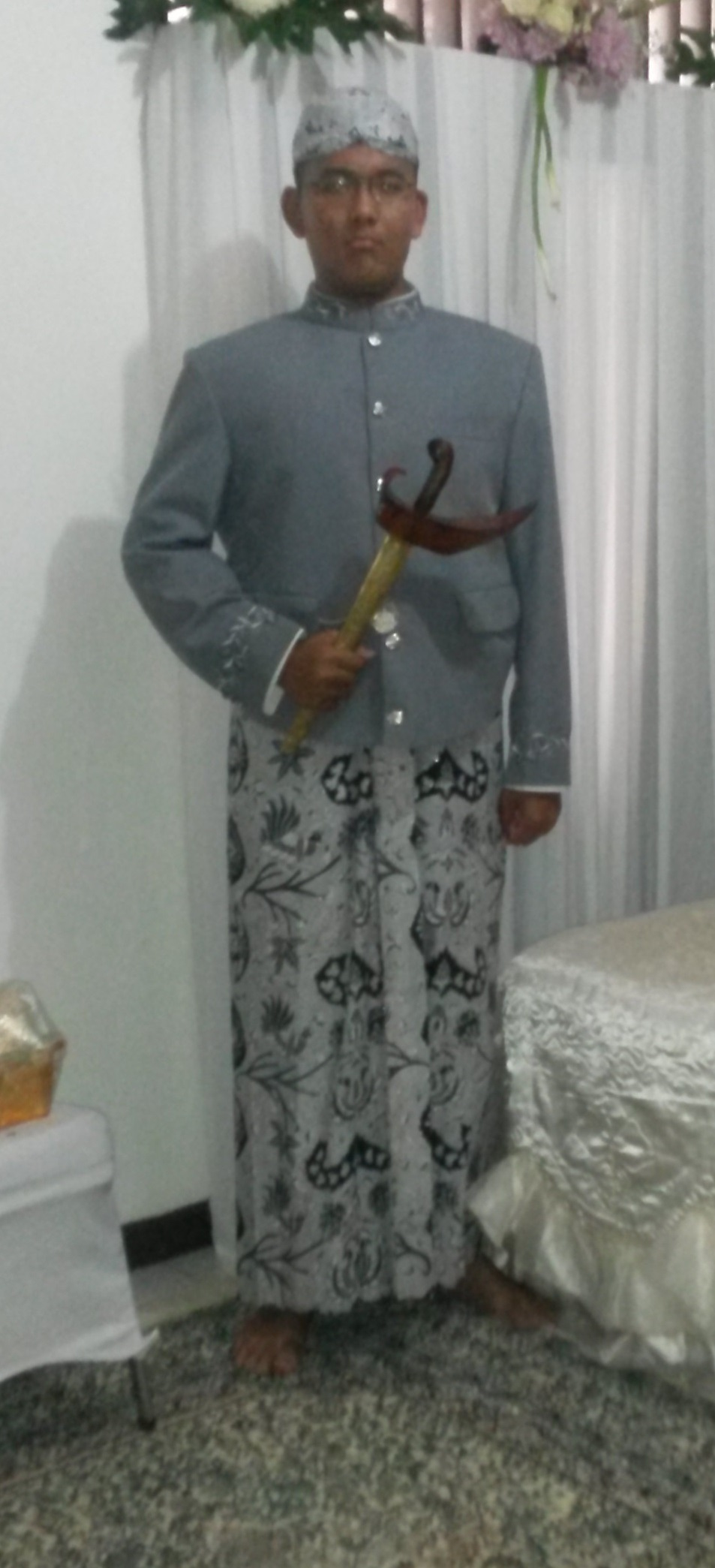
Front view.

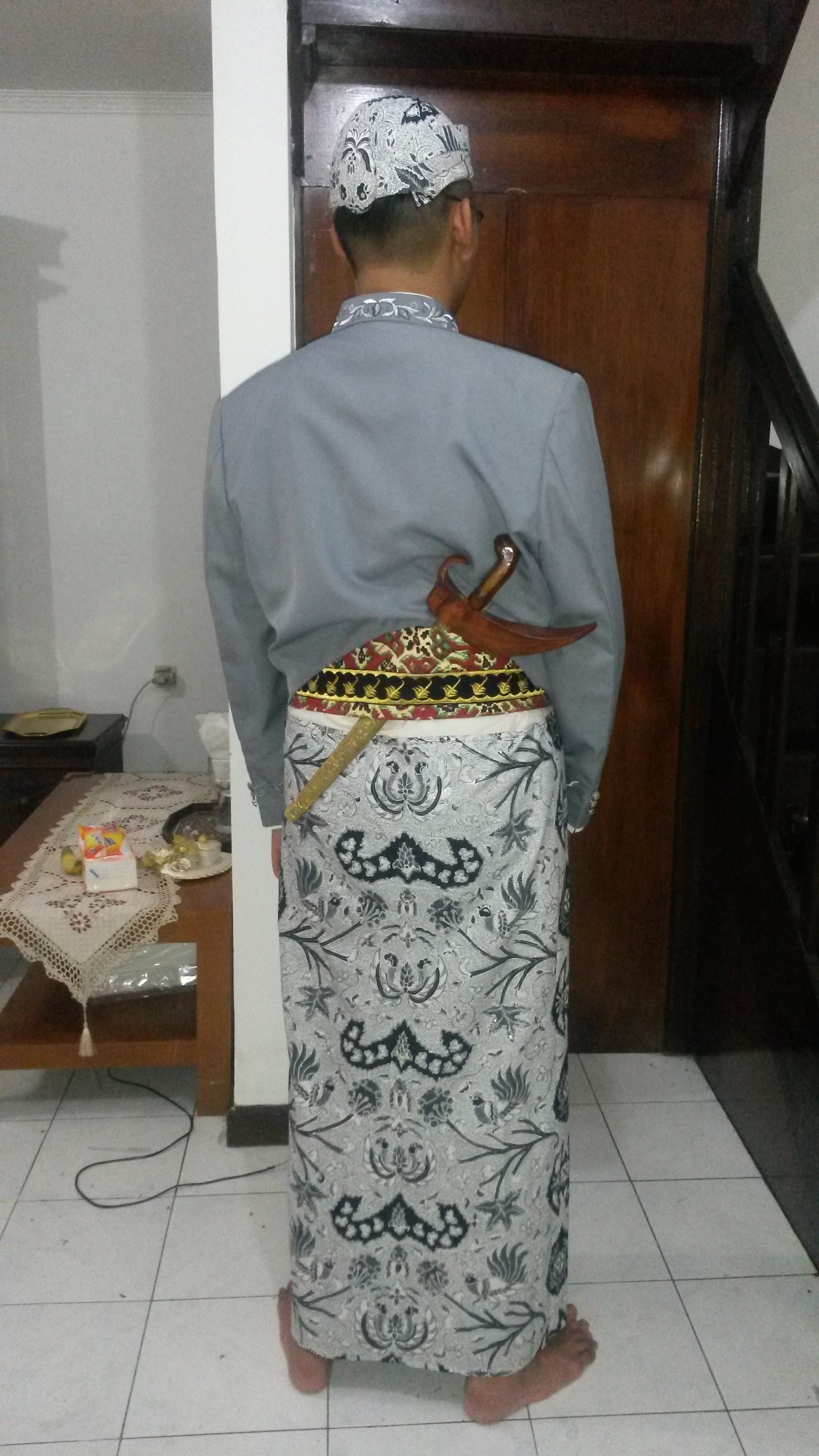
Rear view.

Javanese beskap traditional attire for men usually worn during wedding ceremonies by the family with a kris and blangkon

In the Indonesian archipelago, the most basic and traditional way to wear a traditional garments, is just by wrapping the traditional fabrics around the hips as kain or sarong and secure it; and for women, wrapping the torso with kemben (torso wrap). This practice can still be found in Java, Bali, and Nusa Tenggara. Nevertheless, the development and the expansion of sewing and clothing techniques has creates tailored shirts for men and women. Tight fitting women's kebaya and tailored batik shirt for men is the example of traditional clothing that today transcends ethnic boundaries in Indonesia and has become a national attire. Other than those two, there are a number of tailored shirts or clothing developed in Indonesia.

==== Men ====
- Baju koko also known as baju takwa, a traditional Indonesian men Muslim shirt, worn usually during religious occasions, such as shalat jumat or during lebaran (Eid al-Fitr) festival. It is usually worn with the sarong and peci.
- Beskap, Javanese traditional clothing worn usually by men for formal traditional attire

==== Women ====
- Kemben, is a classic Javanese female torso wrap historically common in Java and Bali, commonly uses batik cloth.
- Baju kurung, Malay women's blouse.
- Baju bodo, Bugis-Makassar women's loose and rather transparent blouse, from South Sulawesi.
- Daster is a women's informal home-dress made of thin fabric and is a full body dress. It usually has the motives of batik patterns and is widely worn by women inside the home in Indonesia.

=== Headgear ===
Each different region, island, tribe, and culture in Indonesia has its own head-dress/head-gear worn traditionally by the particular people of the area. The peci or songkok is the national formal head-dress worn by men all over Indonesia, usually worn by government officials. Men's head-dress are usually made of traditional fabrics, while women's head-dress often consists of metal jewelries sometimes decorated with floral arrangements. Examples of different head-dress across the country are:

==== Men ====
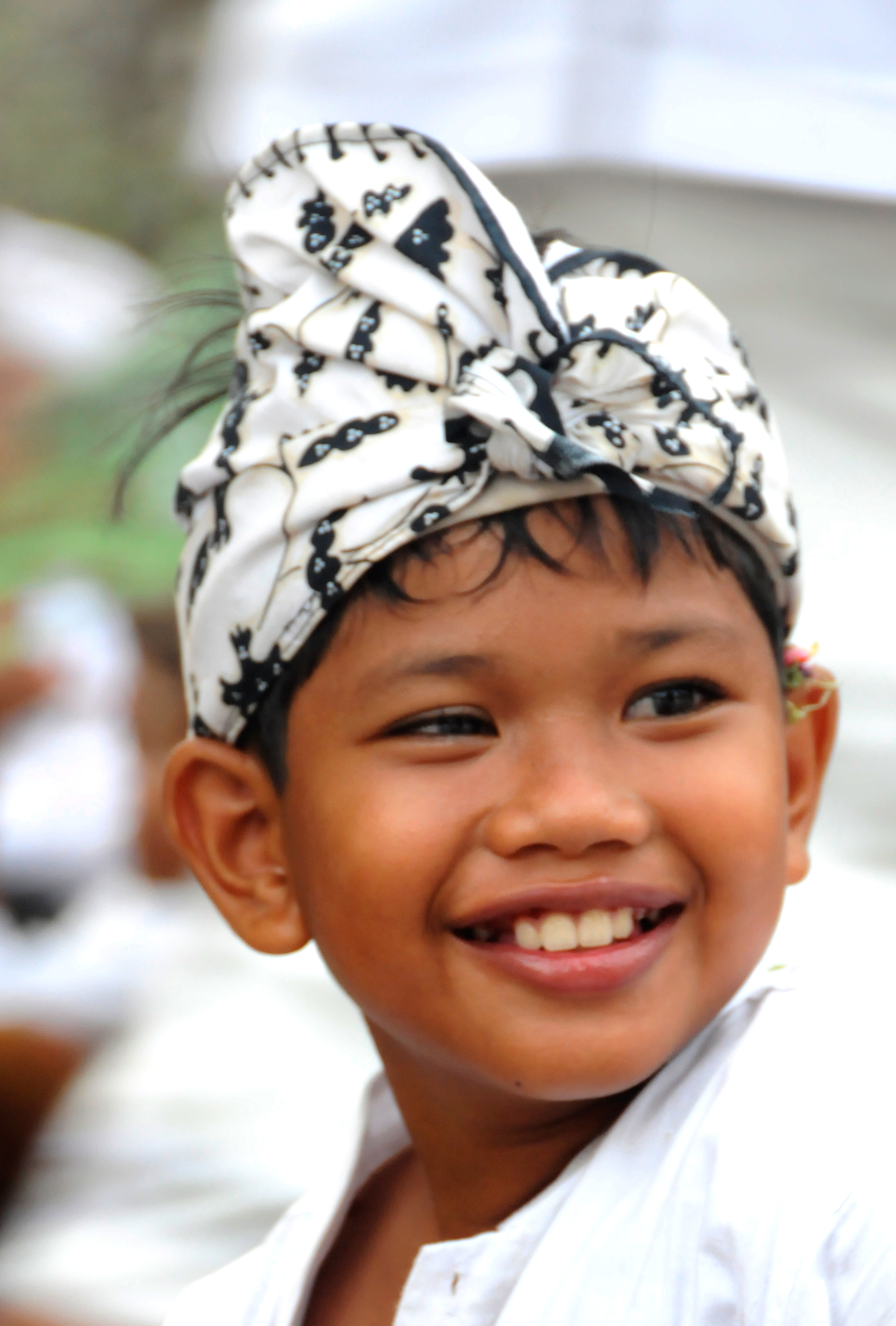
A boy wearing the Balinese udeng

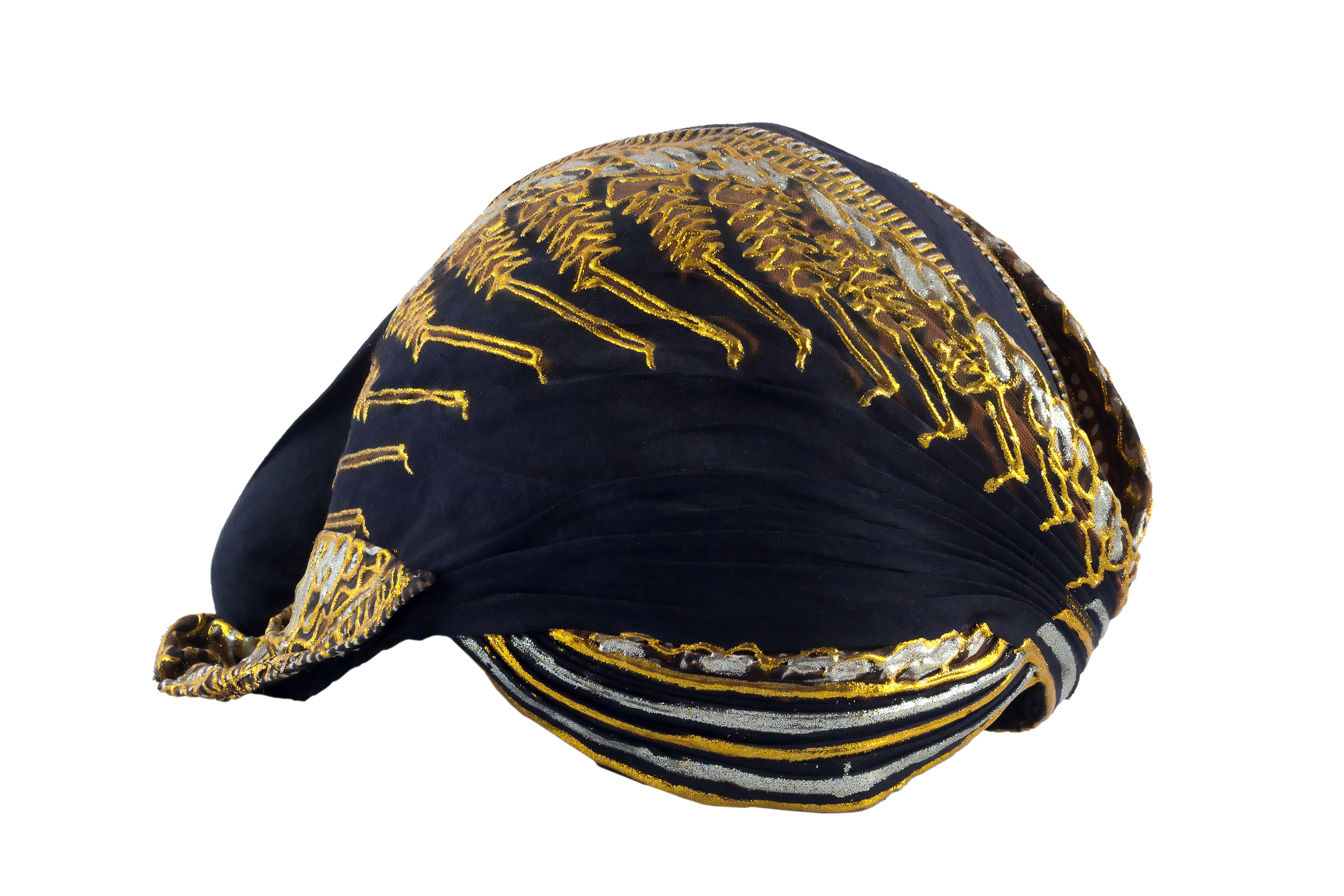
A Javanese Yogyakartan blangkon

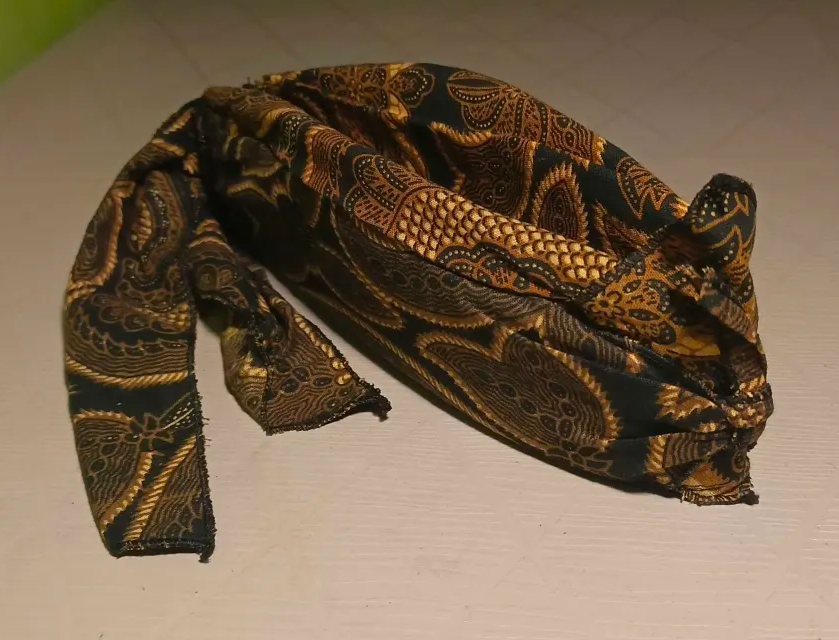
A Sundanese iket

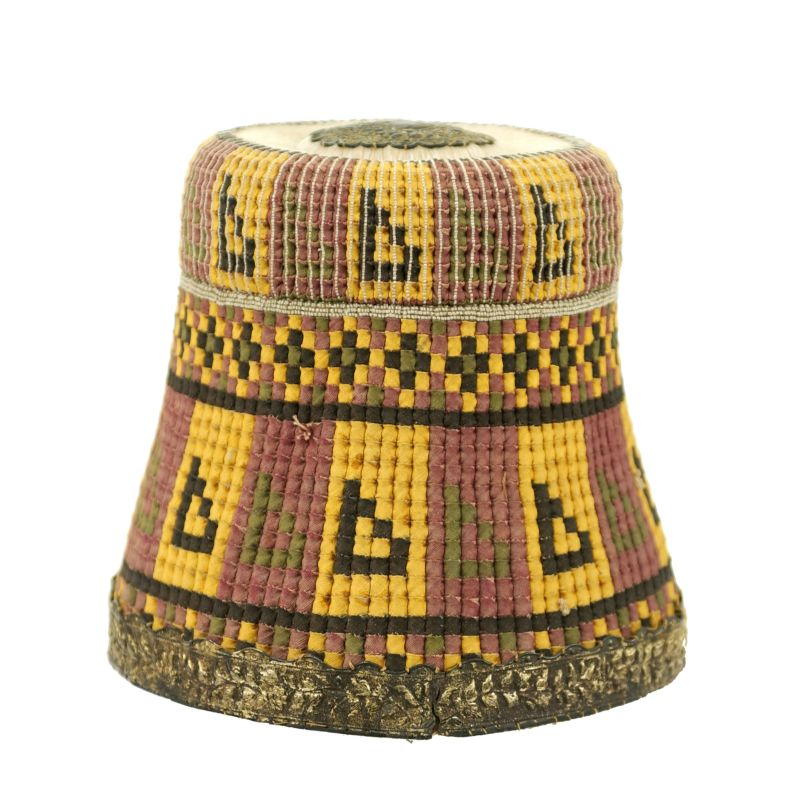
An Acehnese kupiah meukeutob

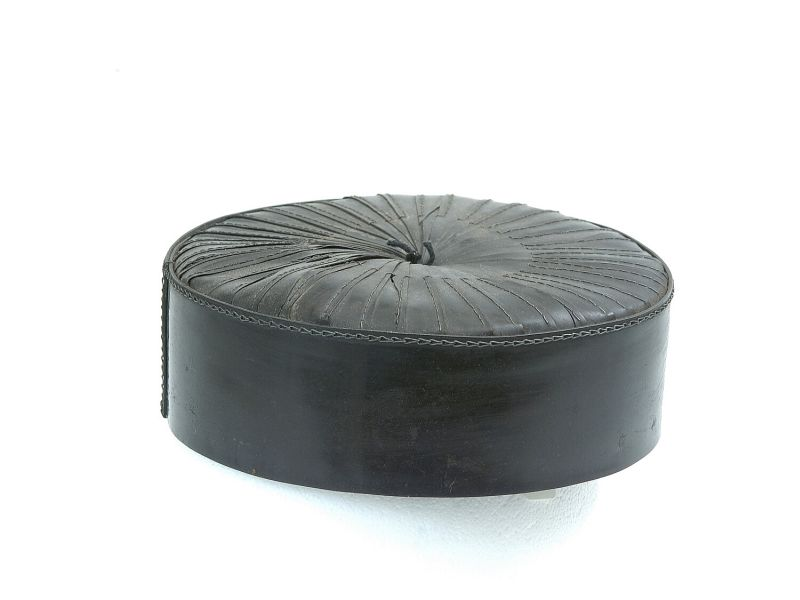
A Bugis-style songkok from Bima

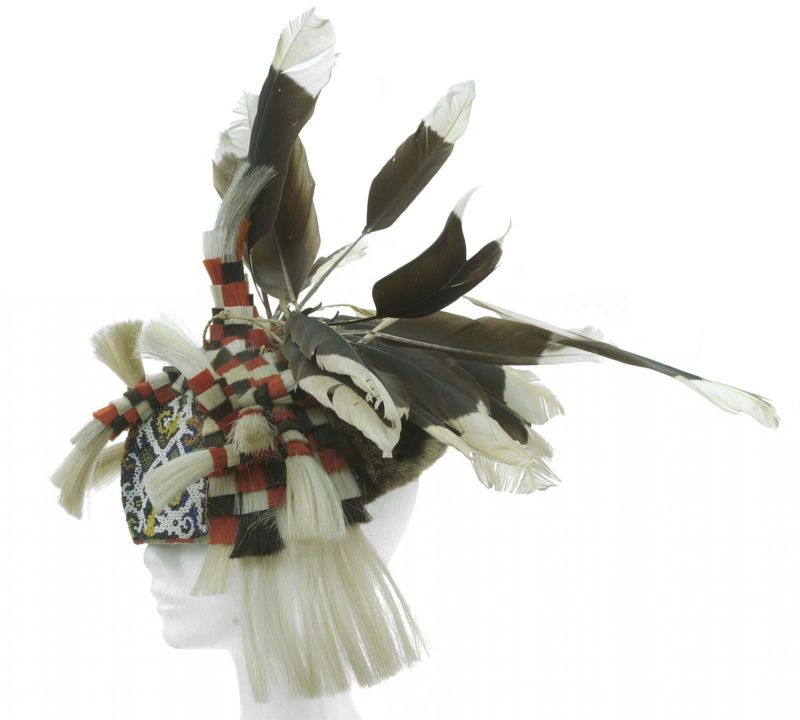
A Dayak feathered hat beluko

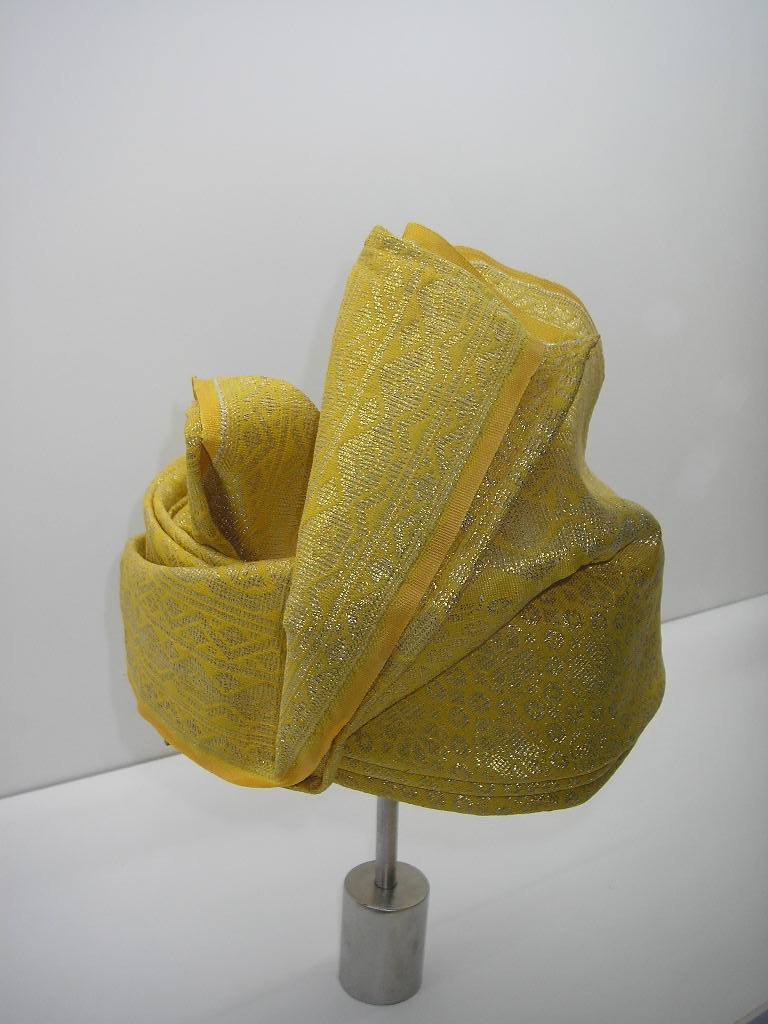
A Malay tanjak
- Blangkon, Javanese men's headgear
- Iket, Sundanese men's headgear
- Kupiah, Acehnese men's headgear
- Tanjak, Malay men's headgear
- Udeng, Balinese men's headgear
- Beluko, Dayak feathered hat; there are different versions for men and women
- Songkok Recca, Buginese men's headgear
- Passapu, Makassarese men's headgear

==== Women ====
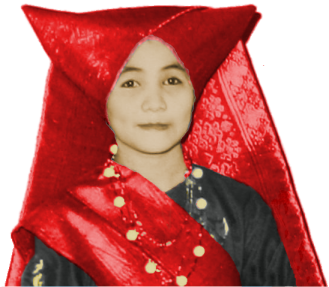
A woman wears a Minang tengkuluk tanduk horned head-dress.

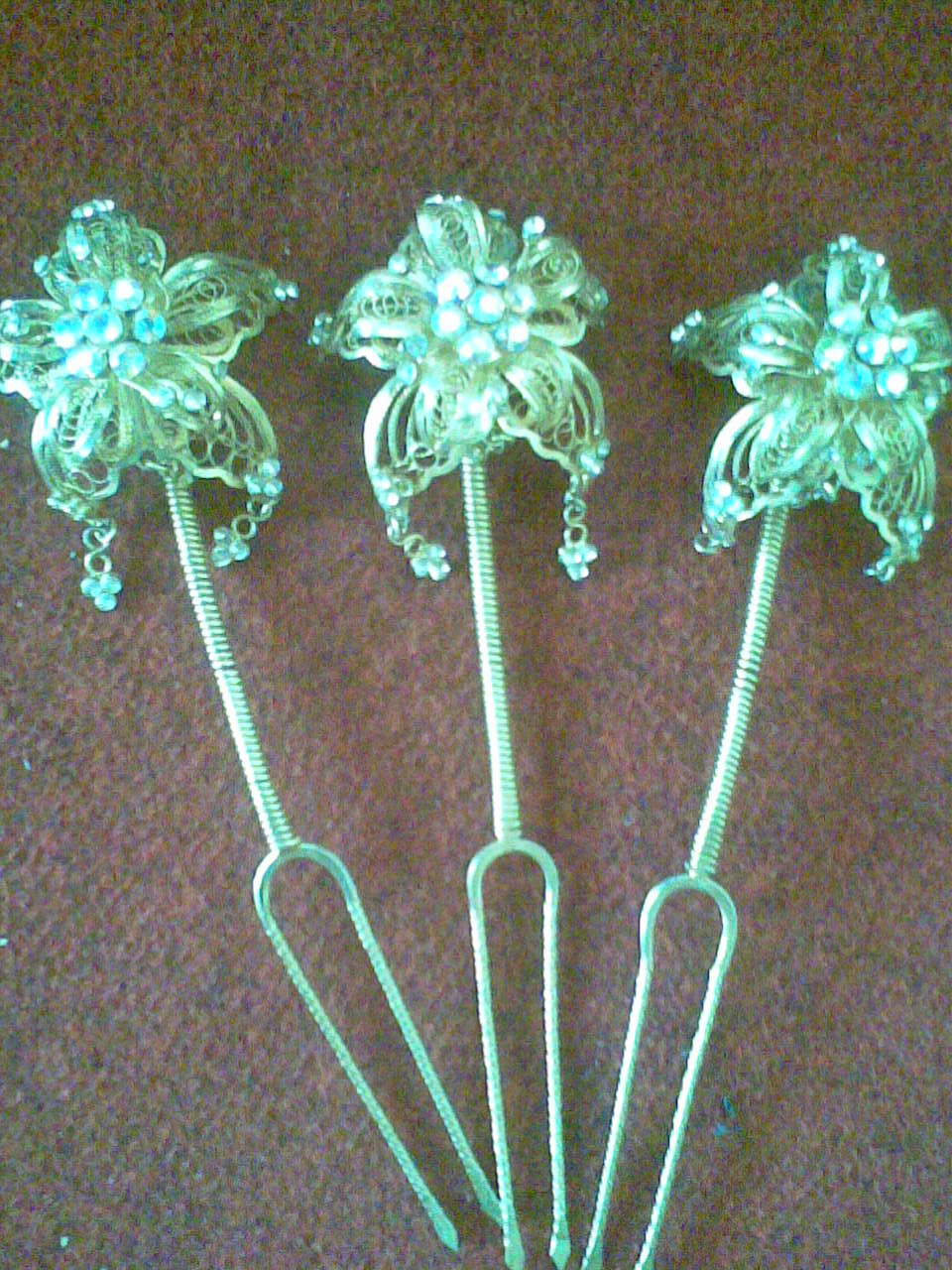
Cunduk mentul or kembang goyang hair ornament

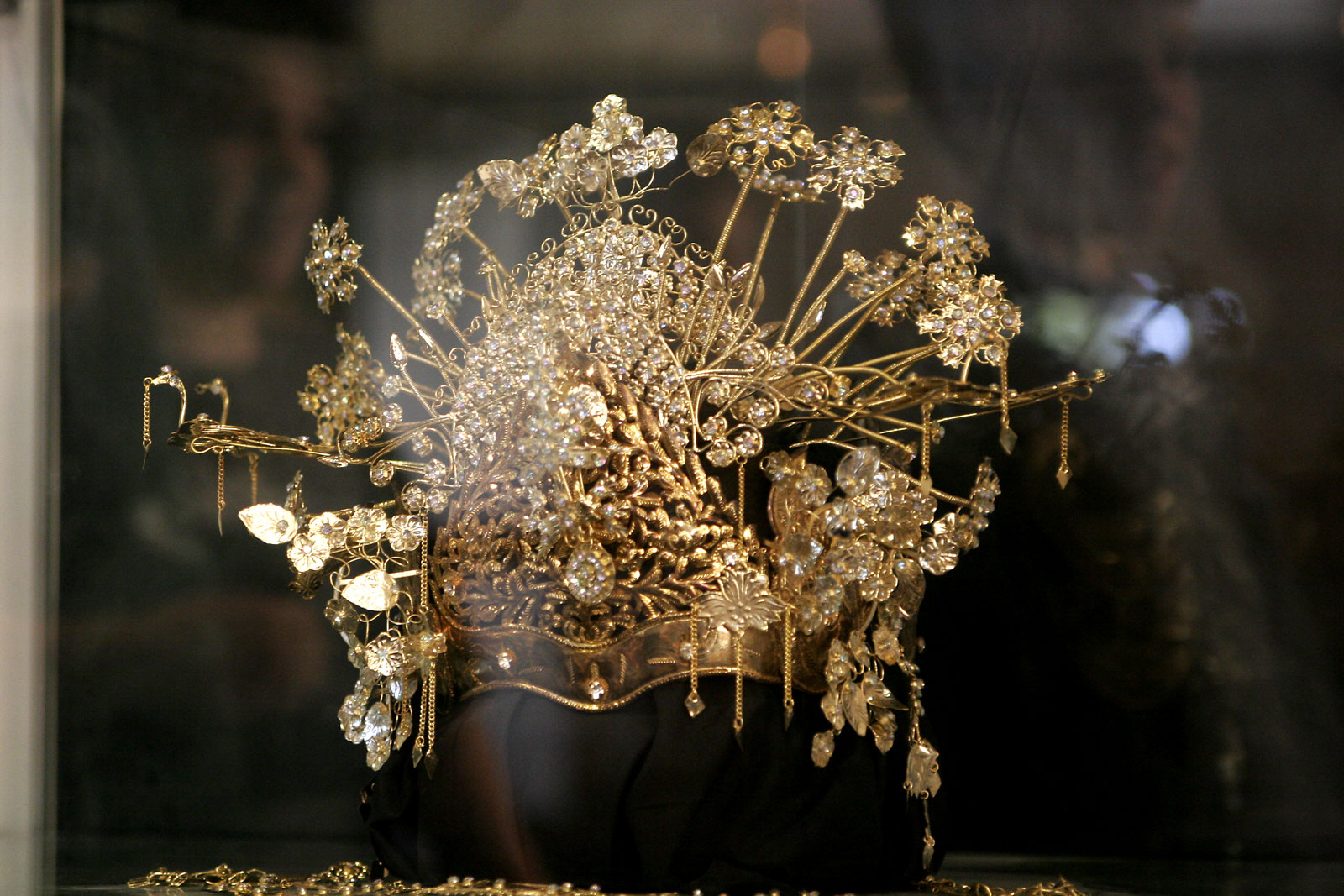
A traditional Indonesian women's head-dress; jamang or siger crown and kembang goyang

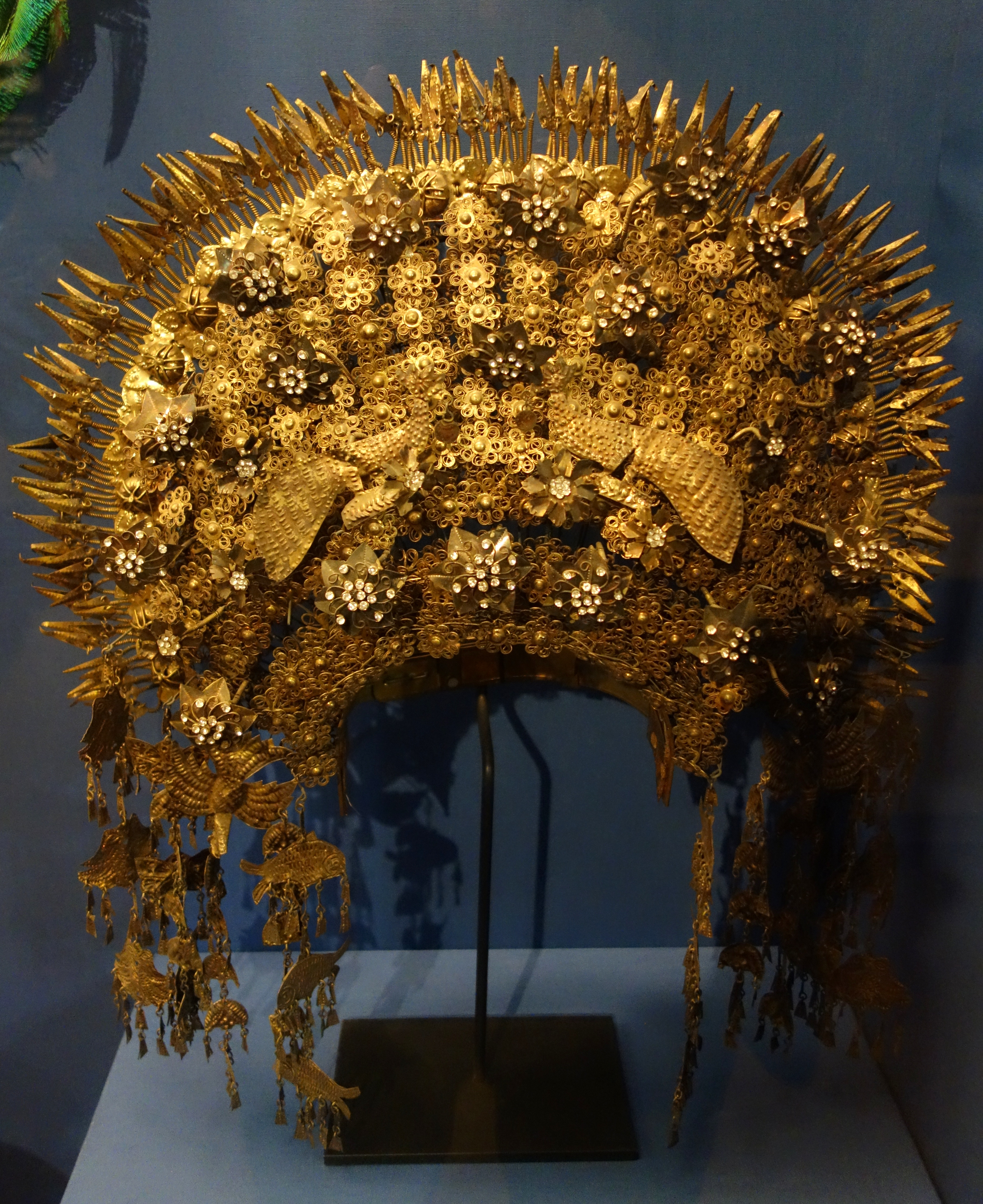
A Minang suntiang, gilded crown for bride

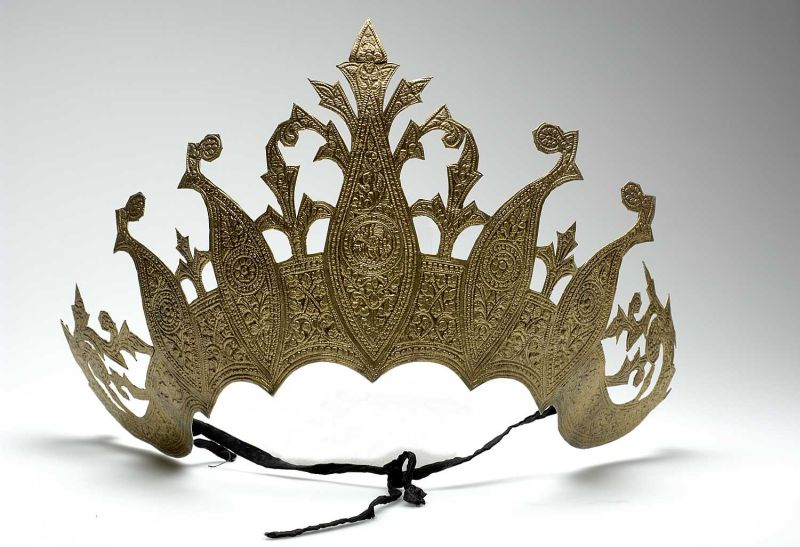
A Palembang-style siger, singkar sukun pa sangko, gilded crown for bride or dancer

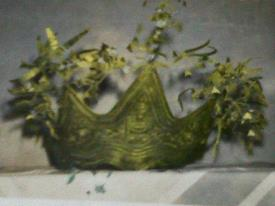
A traditional Lampung siger headgear
- Konde or sanggul, originally referred to a type of hairdo. Today, it refers to a hairbun extension, attached to the back of the head. Commonly worn by women in Java and Bali as a part of their kain kebaya attire. The hairbuns are usually made from natural human hair. Konde is usually secured with a tusuk konde hairpin, and adorned with a jasmine flower garland or other hair ornaments.
- Kembang goyang (lit.: "trembling flower") or cunduk mentul, a golden flower ornament attached to the hairbun. Similar metallic floral hair ornaments can be found throughout Indonesia, however it is more prevalent in Java and Bali.
- Jamang, a gilded tiara-like crown, worn around the forehead to the side of the head. It was derived from Hindu-Buddhist heritage, now still worn in Javanese and Balinese wayang orang performance, Javanese srimpi dancers, and Sundanese bride headgear.
- Siger, a large horned and gilded Lampung women's headgear. Today, usually made of brass. In Palembang, a smaller similar version is known as singkar.
- Suntiang, a tall, large and rather heavy Minang gilded crown for the bride. Traditionally made from gold, today however, usually made from brass.
- Tengkuluk tanduk, a horned head-dress made from folded traditional fabrics (usually songket), unique to Minang culture, especially Bundo Kanduang attire.
- Kerudung, a traditional Muslim women's veil of loosely worn cloth over the head. Unlike completely covered jilbab, parts of hairs and neck are still visible.
- Jilbab, a more conservative generic Muslim women's veil, adopted from Middle Eastern style. Usually worn by more conservative Muslim women. Unlike kerudung, hair and neck are completely covered.

== See also ==
- Culture of Indonesia
- Etiquette in Indonesia
- Indonesian cuisine
- Native Indonesian
- Rumah adat
