= Iket =

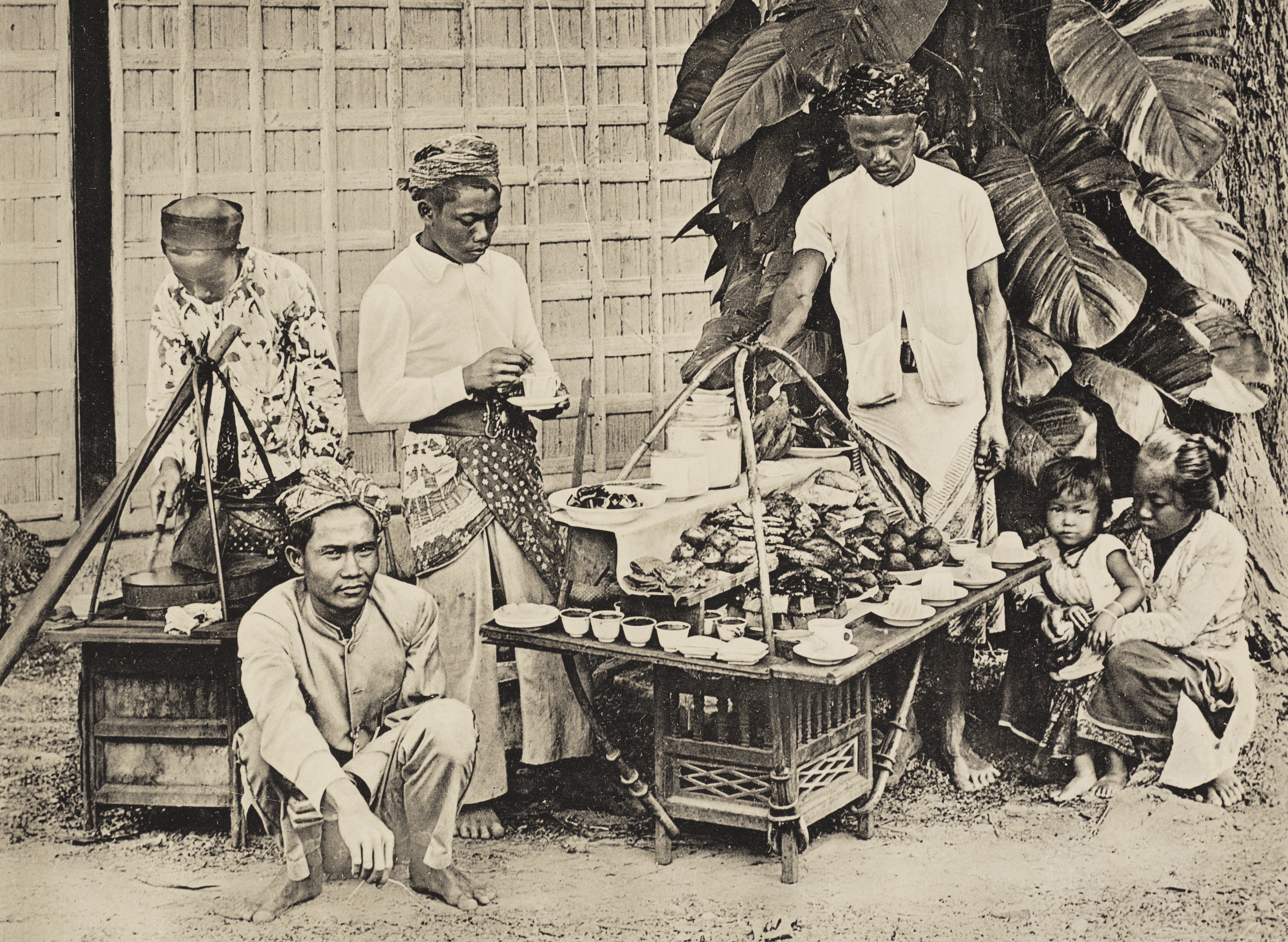
- Sundanese men wearing iket buhun.
- Type: Traditional headgear
- Material: Batik
- Place of origin: Java, Bali, Lombok
- Manufacturer: Sundanese, Javanese, Balinese

Iket (Sundanese: ᮄᮊᮨᮒ᮪), also known as totopong (ᮒᮧᮒᮧᮕᮧᮀ), udeng (Sundanese: ᮅᮓᮨᮀ; Javanese: ꦲꦸꦝꦺꦁ, romanized: udheng) is a traditional headgear used throughout Java, Bali, and Lombok, usually made of batik fabric.

== Name ==
The term iket comes from the Sundanese language. Originally meant "to tie" or "to knot", it later evolved to specifically mean a type of tied cloth used as headwear. The term totopong is derived from the word tepung (to meet) with initial reduplication.

== Sundanese iket ==
Iket or totopong is a part of the traditional Sundanese male attire, it holds high importance and prestige due to the diligence and patience required to wear one. Iket is traditionally used as fashion complementary for certain occasions such as traveling, visiting, or attending traditional ceremonies as a sign of honour and dignity. Other than fashion, iket also serves other functions such as to store items or money, as a self-defence weapon, or as a pad for prostration during prayers when prayer rugs aren't available. In modern times, iket is primarily used as a symbol of cultural heritage and has largely fallen out of wide use outside of cultural events.

While iket and totopong are often interchangeable in speech, totopong refers to a more low-class style headwear, worn by merchants, workers, and farmers, and is considered less polite to the more high and middle-class udeng worn by nobles or formal ceremonies. Iket is also differentiated into eras:

- Iket buhun (ᮄᮊᮨᮒ᮪ ᮘᮥᮠᮥᮔ᮪) or iket baheula (ᮄᮊᮨᮒ᮪ ᮘᮠᮩᮜ, 'old times iket') refers to the traditional totopong used pre-modern times, it's made using a square-shaped cloth. In certain communities, it is still used as a symbol of Sundanese identity, seen in traditional weddings and ceremonies.
- Iket kiwari (ᮄᮊᮨᮒ᮪ ᮊᮤᮝᮛᮤ, 'modern iket') refers to modern forms of iket. Beginning in the early 2000s, iket kiwari represents a form of appreciation from Sundanese cultural figures, communities, and artists. Unlike iket buhun, the different shapes of iket doesn't represent difference in position or social status, but rather the occupation of the wearer.

=== Types of iket ===
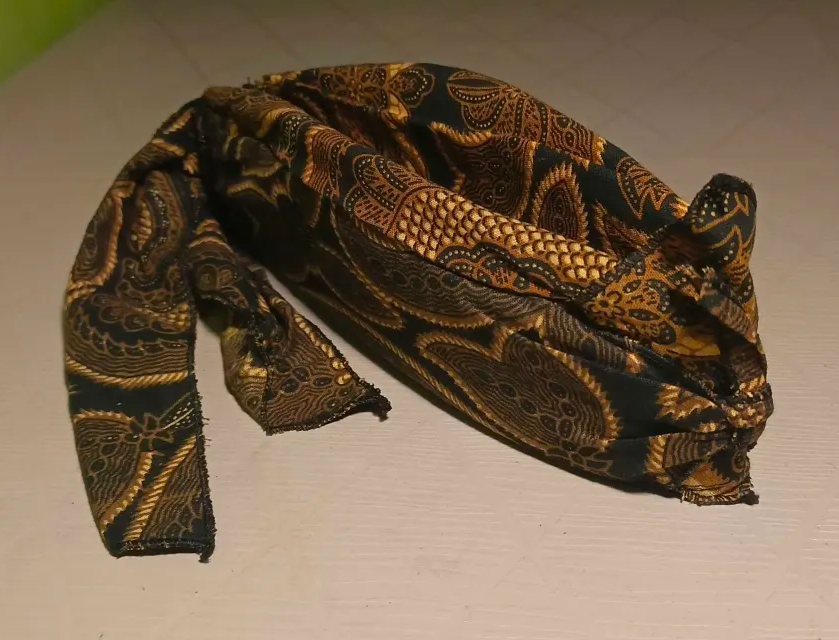
A parékos styled practical Sundanese iket

Iket has a wide variety of forms and types, they can be divided into usage and styles:

==== By usage ====
- Iket amparan is the traditional way of wearing an iket. Using a cloth in the shape of a square, triangle or rectangle, it is folded, wrapped, and then tied to the head.
- Iket praktis (or practical iket) is a type of iket that is made by sewing cloth to the preferred shape, it's similar to a songkok in usage.

==== By style ====
- Barangbang Semplak (broken coconut leaf branch): Characterised by a triangular-shaped fabric that hangs at the back of the head, resembling a fallen coconut or sugar palm leaf.
- Parékos or Paros (folded and turned): Characterised by a small triangular part of the fabric that hung down on the top of the head, Parékos is further divided into several other categories:
  - Parékos Jéngkol (jengkol parékos): Where the end of one of the cloths is pulled forward and tucked under the wrap, so that it appears right in the middle of the forehead.
  - Parékos Nangka (jackfruit parékos): Where the end of one of the cloths isn't tucked, where it's left hanging in front of the forehead.

== Gallery ==
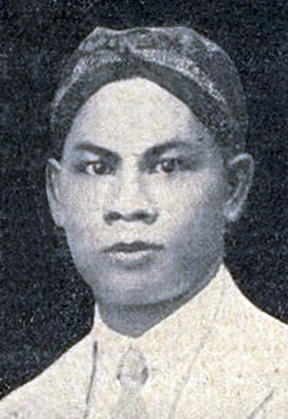
Oto Iskandar di Nata, Indonesian national hero

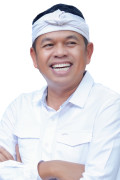
Dedi Mulyadi, Indonesian politician

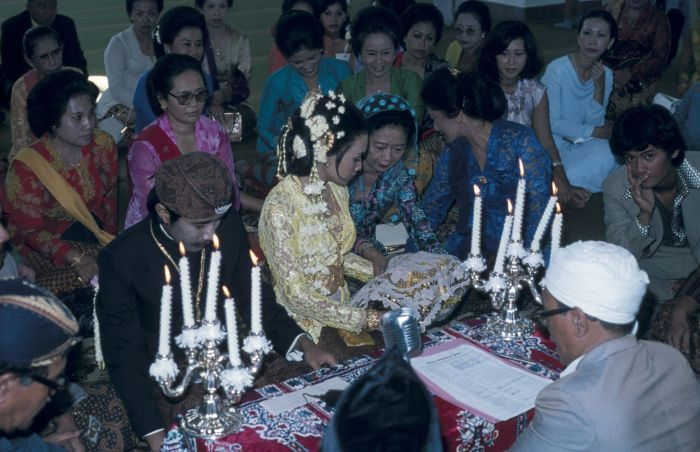
A Sundanese wedding where the bridegroom can be seen wearing an iket

== See also ==
- List of hat styles
- Blangkon
- National costume of Indonesia

== Bibliography ==
- Toekio, Soegeng (1980). Tutup Kepala Tradisional Jawa [Traditional Headwear of Java] (in Indonesian). Direktorat Jenderal Kebudayaan.
- Benny, Cornelia Jane; Wibisana, Wahyu; Sulaeman, Sulaeman; Hamzah, Hamzah (1988). Pakaian Tradisional Daerah Jawa Barat [Traditional Attire of West Java] (in Indonesian). Jakarta: Direktorat Sejarah dan Nilai Tradisional.
