= Beskap =

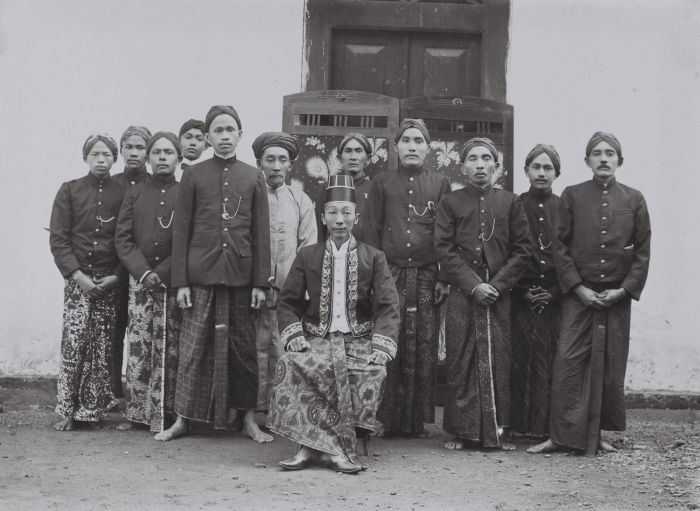
Officials wearing beskap flank Raden Tumenggung Ario Said, the regent (bupati) of Blora, in a photograph taken in June 1921.

Beskap (Javanese: ꦧꦼꦱ꧀ꦏꦥ꧀, in Pegon: بسكَڤ borrowed from Dutch: beschaafd, meaning "civilised" or "polite") is a type of black plain jacket with a high standing collar worn by Javanese men on formal, official, or important occasions such as weddings. This upper-body garment was introduced in the late eighteenth century by the royal courts of Java and later spread to various regions influenced by Javanese culture. It is one of the principal elements of traditional Javanese dress, together with the blangkon.

Its front is asymmetrical, with buttons arranged diagonally rather than vertically. Depending on the type, the cut of the back may vary in length to accommodate the wearing of a kris, tucked into the waist. A beskap is always paired with a jarik, a long batik cloth wrapped around the lower body to cover the upper half of the legs.

== History ==
It was designed by Mangkunegara IV, the ruling duke of Mangkunegaran in Surakarta, for officials serving in the Mangkunegaran Legion when they appeared before Sunan Pakubuwana IX during the opening of the Langenharja royal retreat in 1871. The military unit had been established in 1805 by Herman Willem Daendels, Governor-General of the Dutch East Indies, who strongly supported Napoleon Bonaparte and had served as a volunteer soldier in the Batavian Legion during the French Revolutionary Wars.

== Types of Beskap ==
Beskap comes in several variations with different cuts. The following are the main types of beskap:

- beskap Solo
- beskap Yogya
- beskap landung
- beskap kulon
- beskap kucing anjlok Banyumas

== See also ==
- Gakuran - attire of Japanese schoolboys also originating from the same Dutch attire.
