= Blangkon =

Traditional Javanese headdress

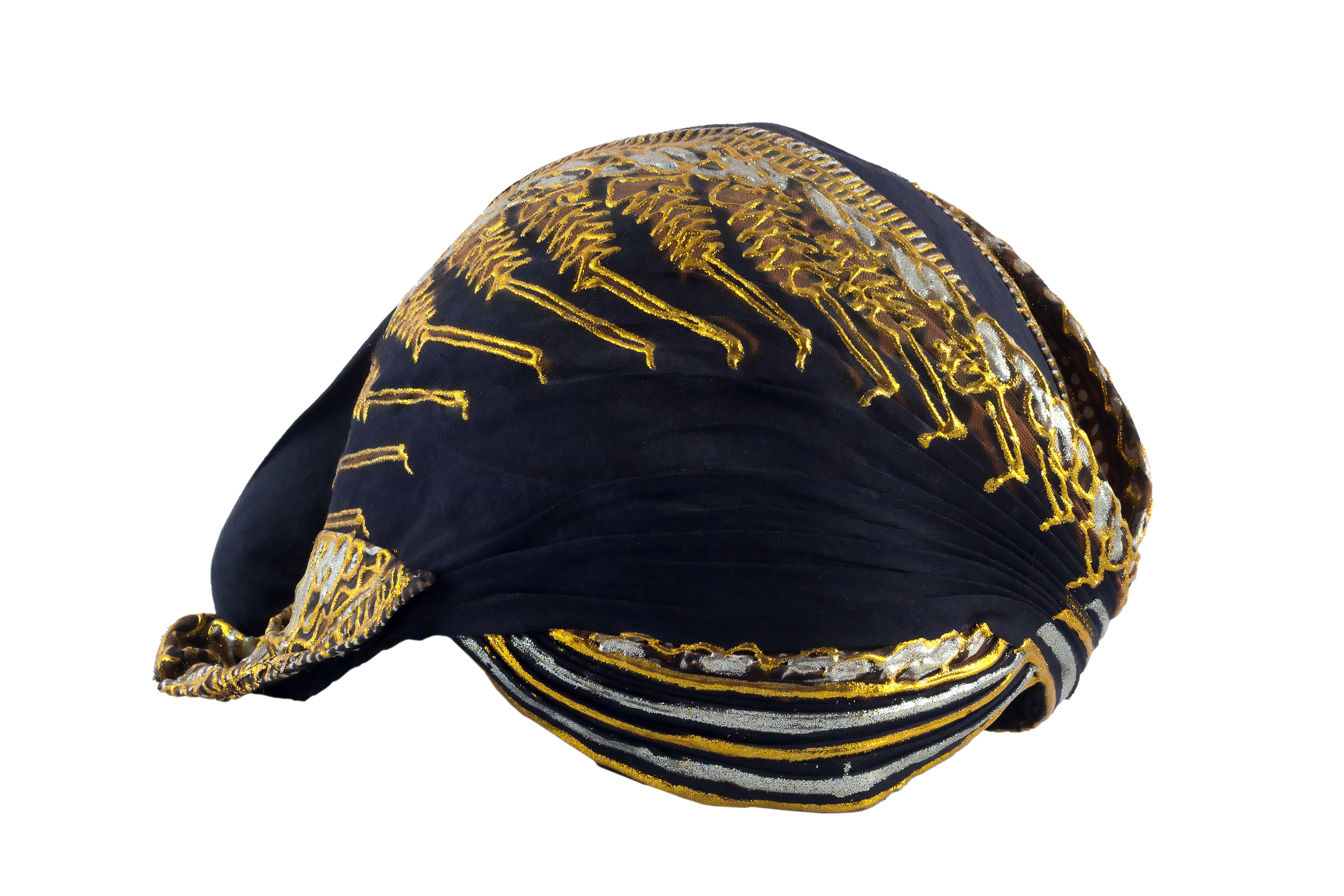
- A Ngayogyakarta-style blangkon, worn for weddings
- Type: Traditional headgear
- Material: Batik
- Place of origin: Indonesia (Java)
- Manufacturer: Javanese

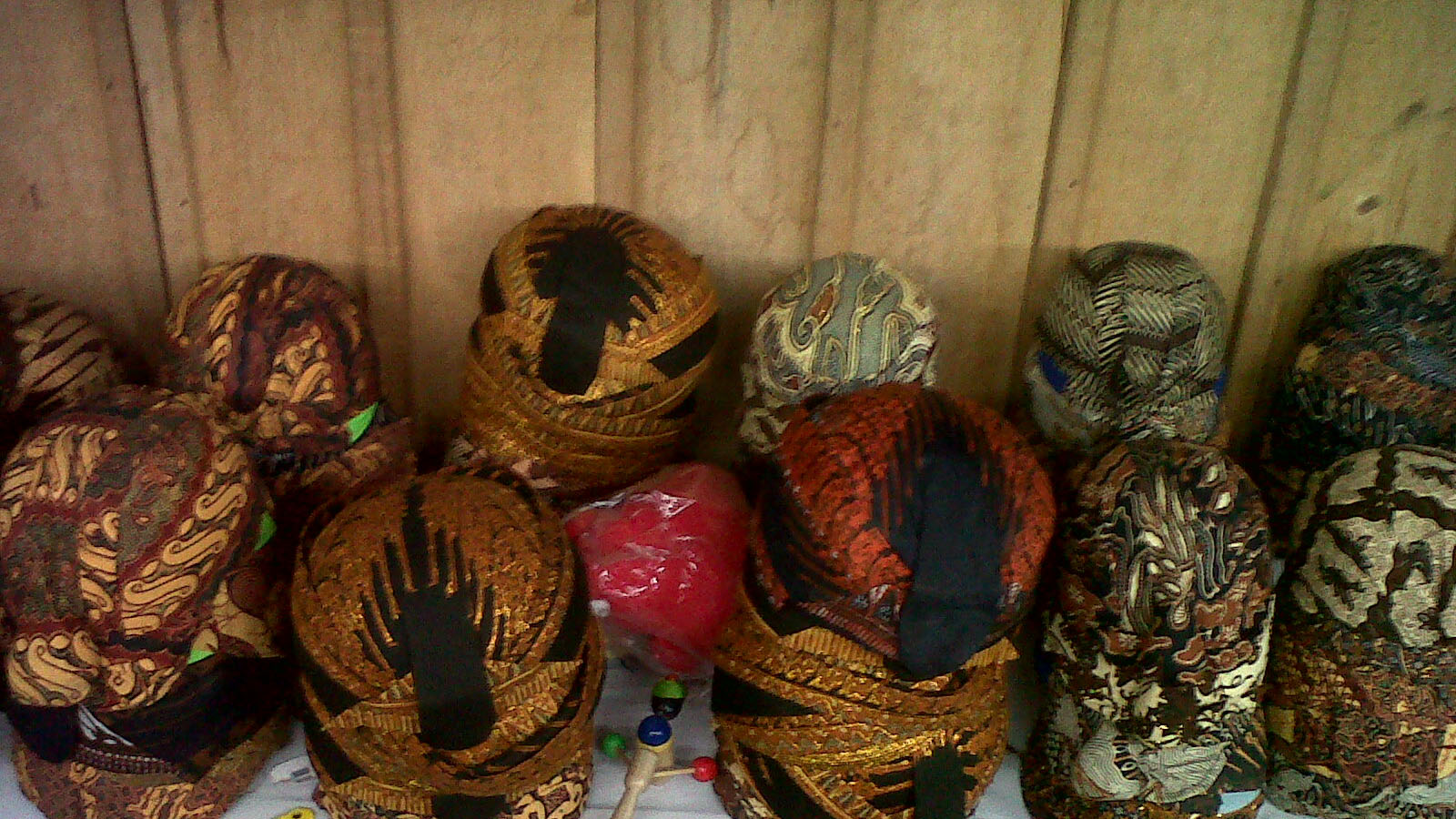
Blangkons, the traditional Javanese headgear

A blangkon (Javanese: ꦧ꧀ꦭꦁꦏꦺꦴꦤ꧀) or belangkon (in Indonesian) is a traditional Javanese headgear worn by men and made of batik fabric. There are four types of blangkons, distinguished by the shapes and regional Javanese origin: Ngayogyakarta, Surakarta, Kedu, and Banyumasan.

== History ==
It is believed that blangkon may be as old as the Javanese script, and inspired from the legendary story of Aji Saka. In the story, Aji Saka defeated Dewata Cengkar, a giant who owned the land of Java, by spreading a giant piece of headdress that could cover the entire land of Java. Aji Saka was also believed to be the founder of the Javanese calendar.

Another theory is that the use of blangkon was adopted by the Javanese due to the combined influence of local Hindu and Islamic culture. The Muslim traders who entered Java were people from various places, including mainland Arab and Gujarati regions, and the blangkon is sometimes believed to be adapted from turbans; however, this is unlikely because the story of Aji Saka itself predates the arrival of Islam in Java.

== Gallery ==
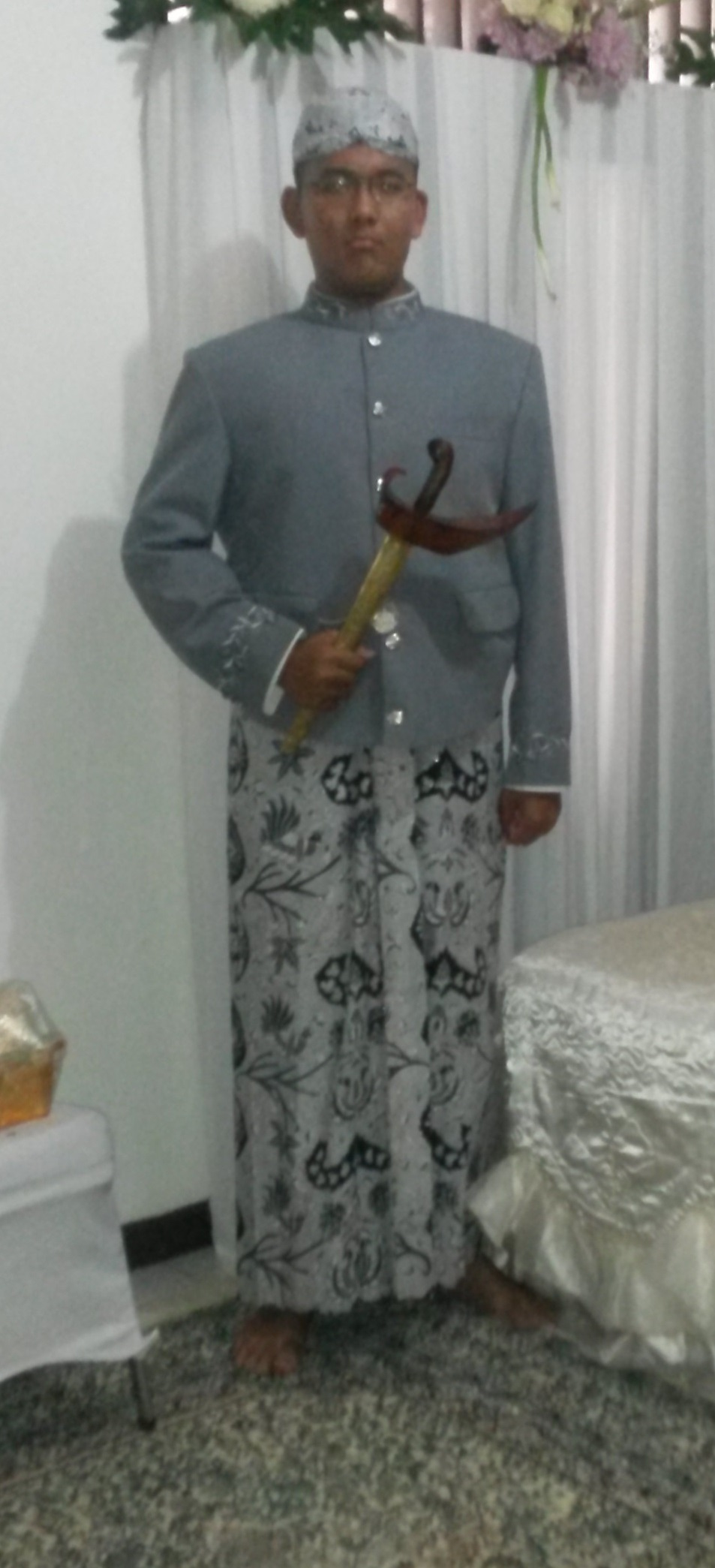
The Javanese traditional attire for men is always worn with the Blangkon and accompanied by a Kris

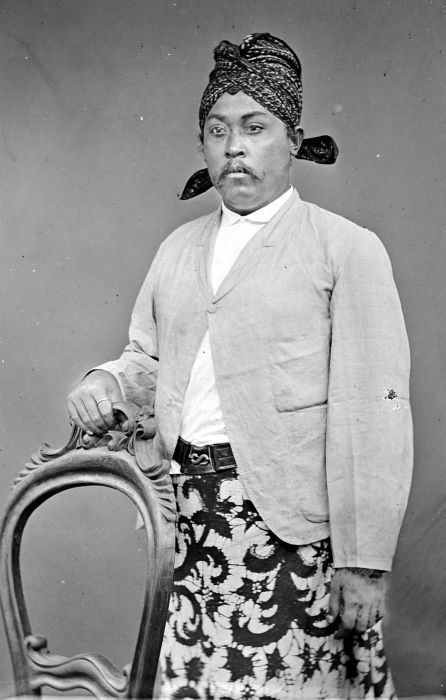
Man wearing a tied version of blangkon

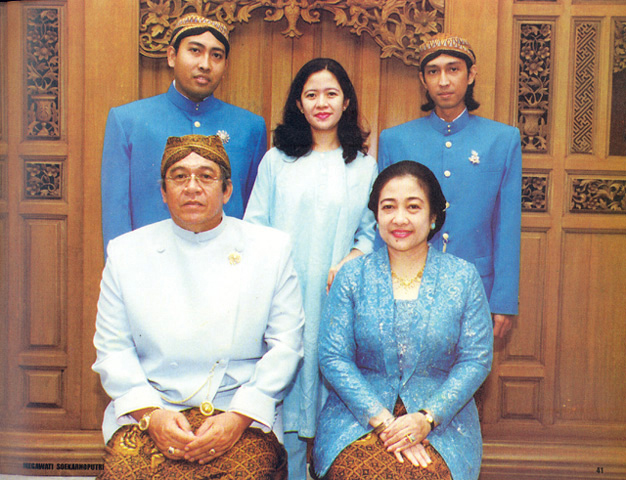
Fifth Indonesian president Megawati and her family

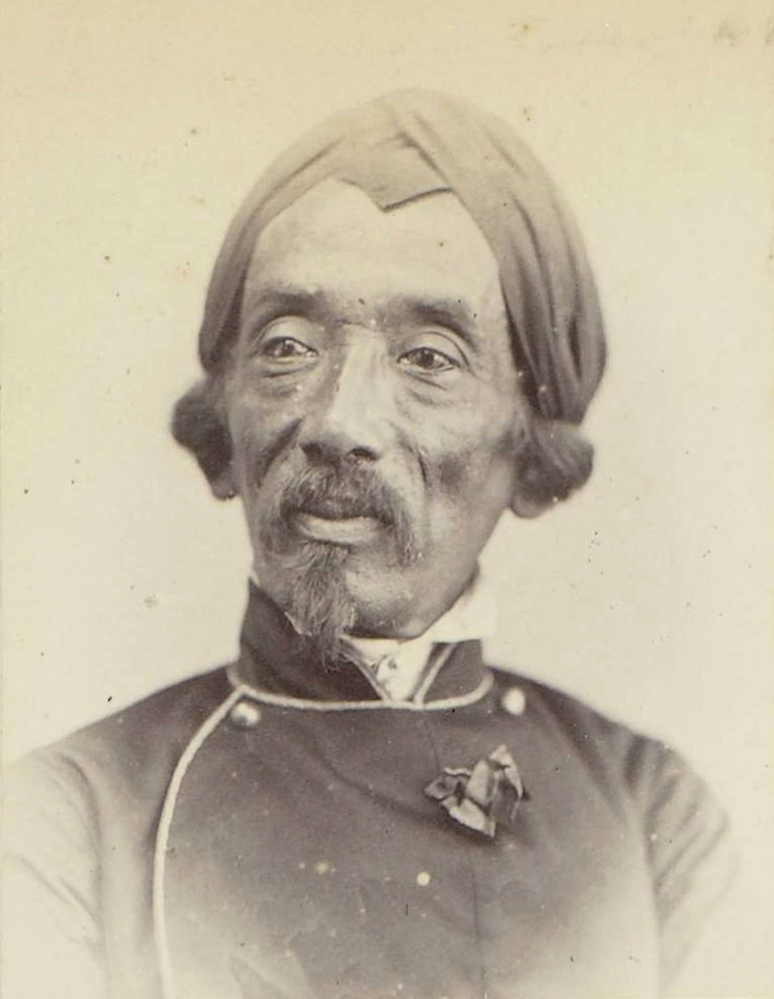
Raden Saleh, a famous Indonesian painter in the colonial era

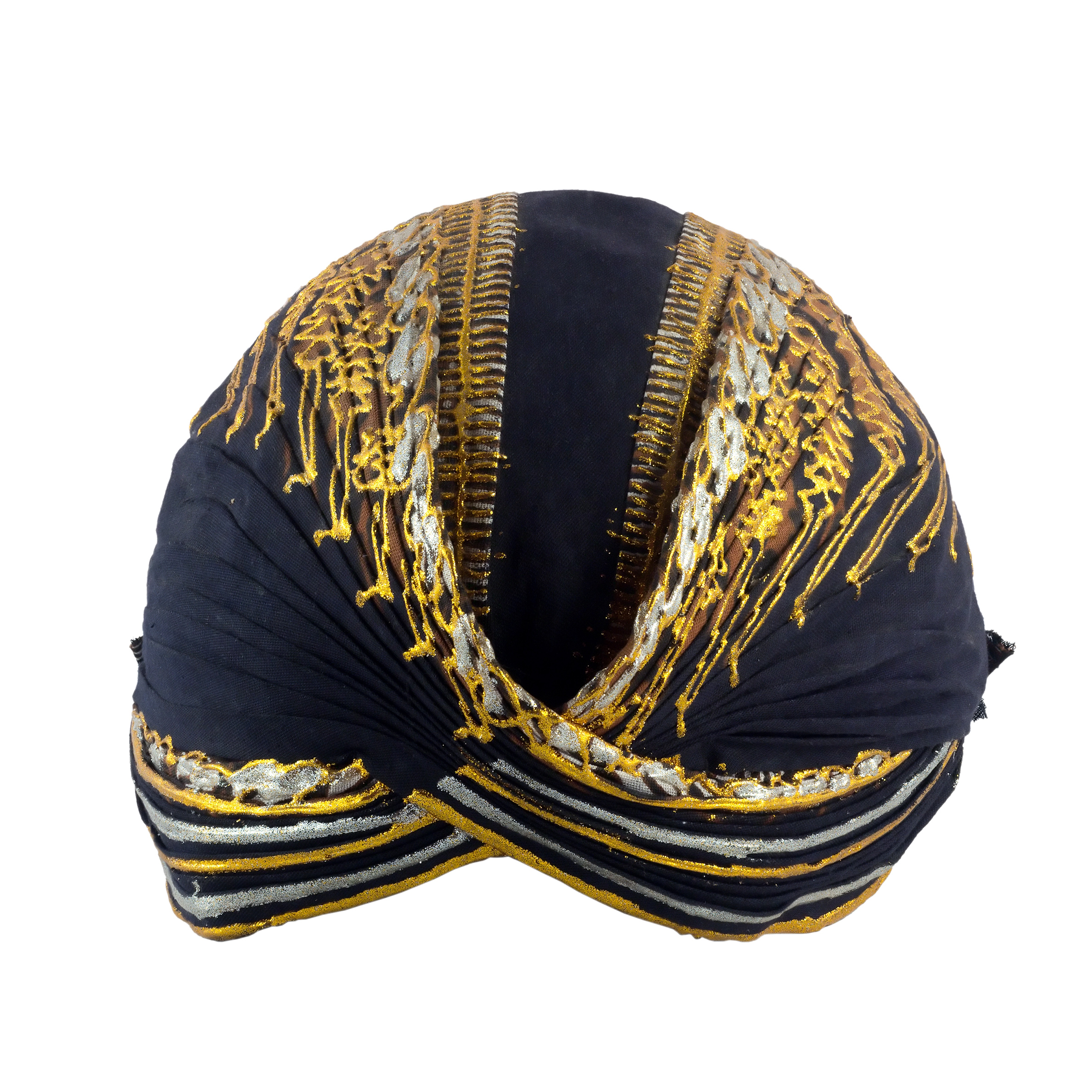
Ngayogyakarta-style blangkon

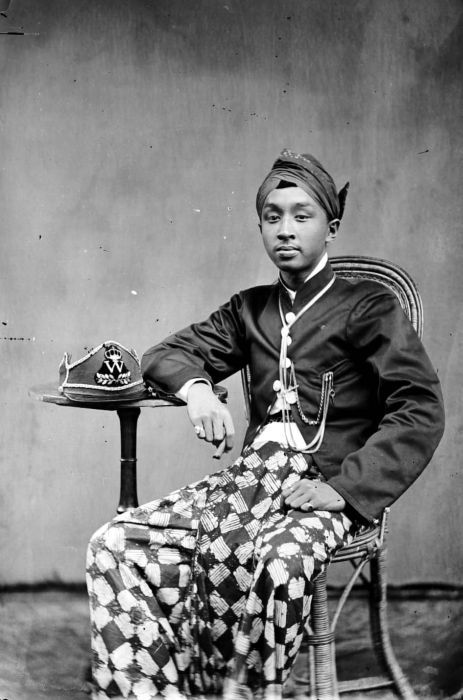
Colonial young man wearing blangkon

== See also ==
- List of hat styles
- Pagri (turban)
- Tengkolok
- Iket
- Malaysian cultural outfits
- Culture of Malaysia
- National costume of Indonesia
- Culture of Indonesia
