= Betawi batik =

Javan native batik of Betawi ethnic, Indonesia

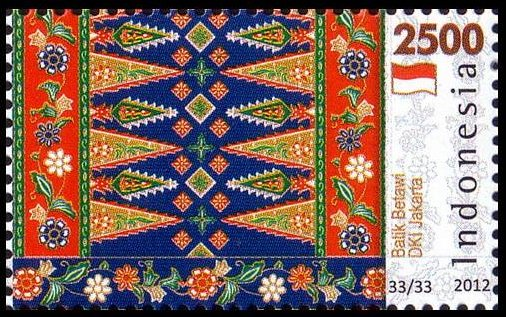
- 2012 Indonesian stamp batik series collection featuring Betawi batik
- Type: Textile art
- Material: Cambrics, silk, cotton
- Production process: Craft production
- Place of origin: Sunda Kalapa (modern-day Greater Jakarta, Indonesia)

Batik
- UNESCO Intangible Cultural Heritage
- Country: Indonesia
- Reference: 00170
- Region: Asia and the Pacific

Inscription history
- Inscription: 2009 (4th session)
- List: Representative

Betawi batik (/ˈbəʈawɪˈbaʈɪʔ/, lit. 'Batavian batik'; Betawi: باتيك بۤتاوي, romanized: batik Betawi) is a traditional cultural Betawi-style of batik, a Javan art and method of producing colored designs on textile. Native to the northwestern coastal region of Java, specifically within the historic Sunda Kalapa region (modern-day Greater Jakarta). Betawi batik is one of the indigenous Java-origin batiks, originally developed and adopted from their ancestral ancient Javanese (mainly Western Javanese, e.g. Pekalongan Javanese and Cirebon-Indramayu Javanese) cultural textile-making tradition. It is well-known for its vibrant colors and distinctive motifs that reflect the rich cultural heritage of the Betawi people.

On 2 October 2009, Batik (including Betawi batik) was internationally recognized by UNESCO as a Masterpiece of Oral and Intangible Heritage of Humanity from Indonesia. Since then, Batik Day has been annually celebrated, both within Indonesia and by the broader Indonesian diaspora on 2 October to commemorate this global recognition.

Since 2017, as part of Indonesia's cultural heritage preservation efforts, the Government of Indonesia, through the Ministry of Education, Culture, Research, and Technology, has initiated the digitization and official inscription of Betawi batik as an element of the nation's intangible cultural heritage. The designation identifies Greater Jakarta and the Seribu Islands as the associated geographical indication, it is protected under national laws.

== Characteristics ==
=== Motifs ===
The motifs of Betawi batik are inspired by the culture of Sunda Kalapa (Greater Jakarta), such as Ondel-ondel (lit. 'traditional Betawi giant puppets'), kembang kelapa (lit. 'coconut flowers'), nusa kelapa (a symbolic unity motif of Sunda Kalapa land), and Pencak Silat Betawi (lit. 'Betawi traditional martial arts').

=== Colors ===
Betawi batik is characterized by bright, contrasting colors, often using reds, yellows, blues, and greens, as opposed to ancient Javanese batik that predominantly used earth tones. This shift reflects Betawi's ethnologic branching out from native Sundanese traditions.
