= Batik in Indonesia =

Cultural tradition

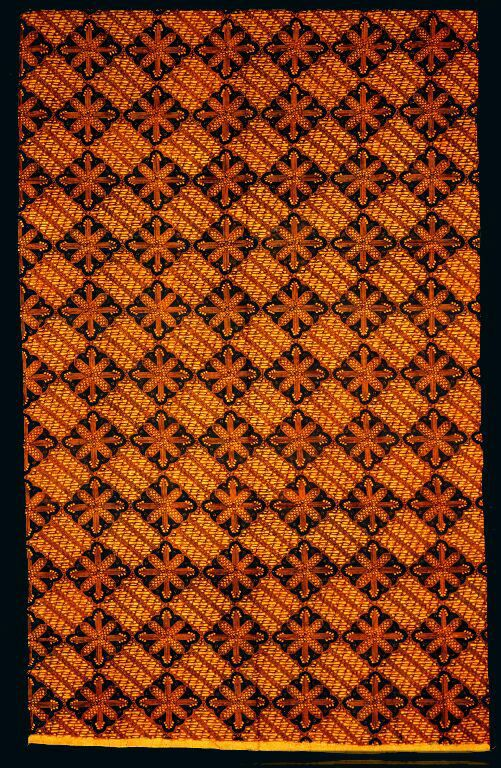
- Batik from Surakarta in Central Java province in Indonesia; before 1997
- Type: Art fabric
- Material: Cambrics, silk, cotton
- Production process: Craft production
- Place of origin: Indonesia

Indonesian Batik
- UNESCO Intangible Cultural Heritage
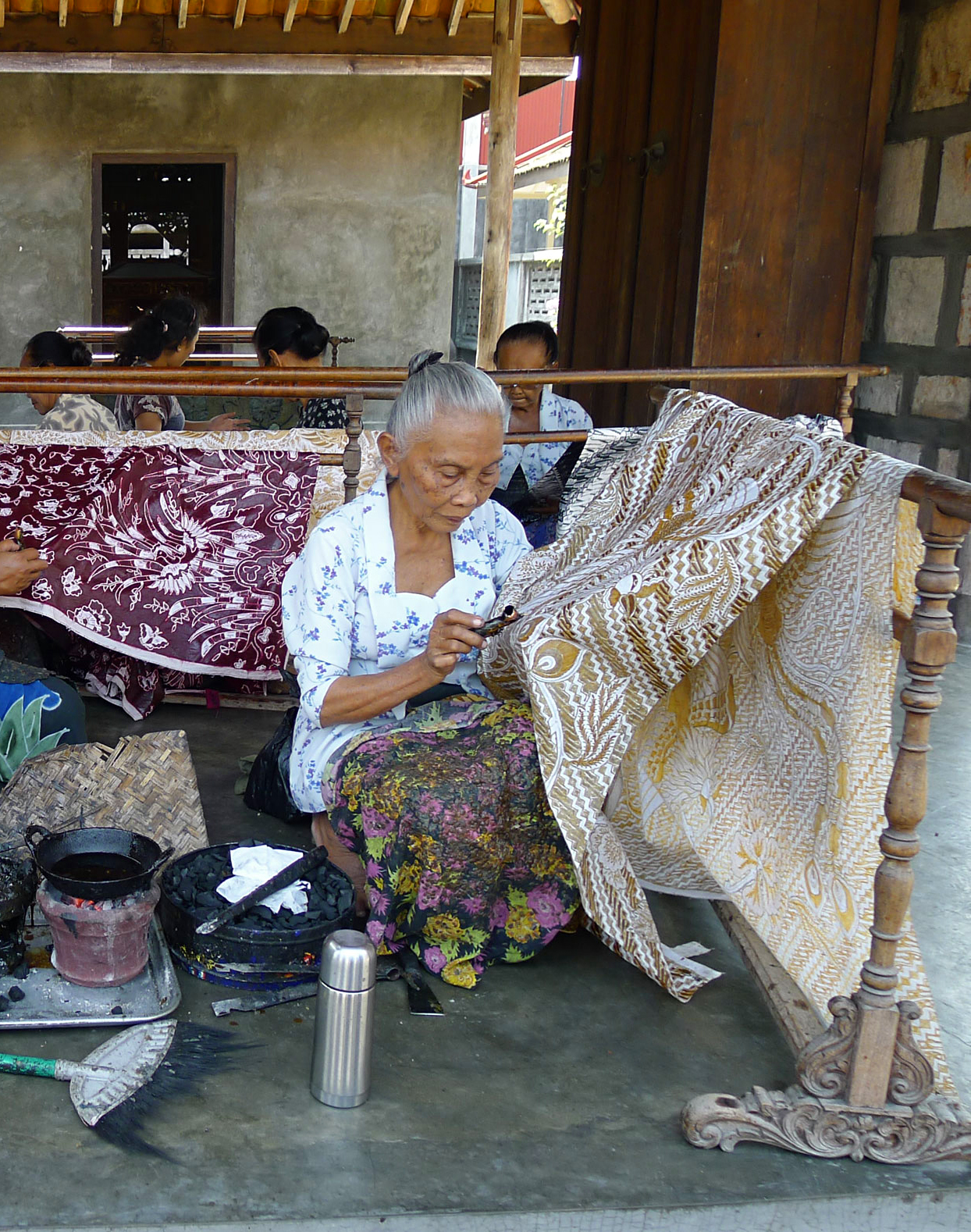
- Batik craftswomen in Java drawing intricate patterns using canting and wax that are kept hot and liquid in a small heated pan, on 27 July 2011
- Country: Indonesia
- Reference: 00170
- Region: Asia and the Pacific

Inscription history
- Inscription: 2009 (4th session)
- List: Representative
- Written batik (batik tulis) and, stamped batik (batik cap)

Education and training in Indonesian Batik (Note: Education and training in Indonesian Batik intangible cultural heritage for elementary, junior, senior, vocational school and polytechnic students, in collaboration with the Batik Museum in Pekalongan)
- UNESCO Intangible Cultural Heritage
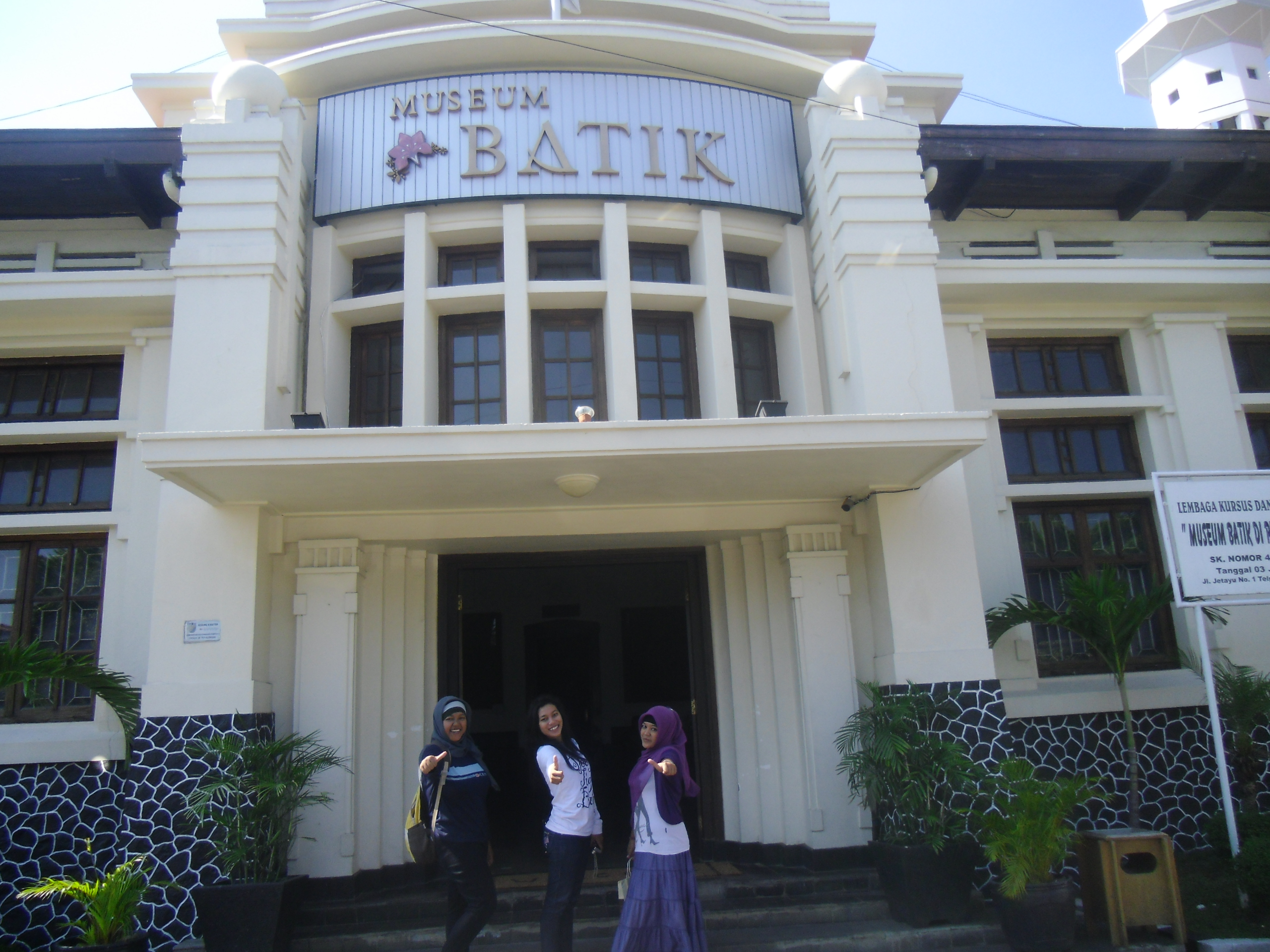
- Museum Batik Pekalongan, Central Java
- Country: Indonesia
- Reference: 00318
- Region: Asia and the Pacific

Inscription history
- Inscription: 2009 (4th session)
- List: Good Safeguarding Practices

Batik plays multiple roles in the culture of Indonesia. The wax resist-dyeing technique has been used for centuries in Java, and has been adopted in varying forms in other parts of the country. Java is home to several batik museums.

On 2 October 2009, UNESCO inscribed written batik (batik tulis) and stamped batik (batik cap) as a Masterpiece of Oral and Intangible Heritage of Humanity from Indonesia. Since then, Indonesia has celebrated a Batik Day (Hari Batik Nasional) annually on 2 October. In the same year, UNESCO recognized education and training in Indonesian Batik as a Masterpiece of Oral and Intangible Heritage of Humanity.

== History ==
=== Ancient to early modern periods ===
The art of batik is most highly developed in the island of Java, although the antiquity of the technique is difficult to determine since batik pieces rarely survive long in the region's tropical climate. The Dutch historians Rouffaer & Juynboll argue that the technique might have been introduced during the 6th or 7th century from India or Sri Lanka. The similarities between some traditional batik patterns with clothing details in ancient Hindu-Buddhist statuaries, for example East Javanese Prajnaparamita, has made some authors attribute batik's creation to Java's Hindu-Buddhist period (8th-16th century AD). Some scholars however object that mere similarity of pattern is not conclusive of batik, as it could be made by a number of non-related techniques. Further, as the word "batik" is not attested in any pre-Islamic sources, there is also the view that batik only flourished at the end of Java's Hindu-Buddhist period, from the 16th century onward following the demise of Majapahit kingdom.

The oldest physical Javanese batik piece to have survived so far is a 700 year old blue-white valance in the private collection of Thomas Murray. The batik's quality and early Majapahit period carbon-dating suggest that sophisticated batik techniques already existed at the time, but competed with the more established ikat textiles. Batik craft further flourished in the Islamic courts of Java in the following centuries.

Some ancient Indonesian statues that use batik motifs

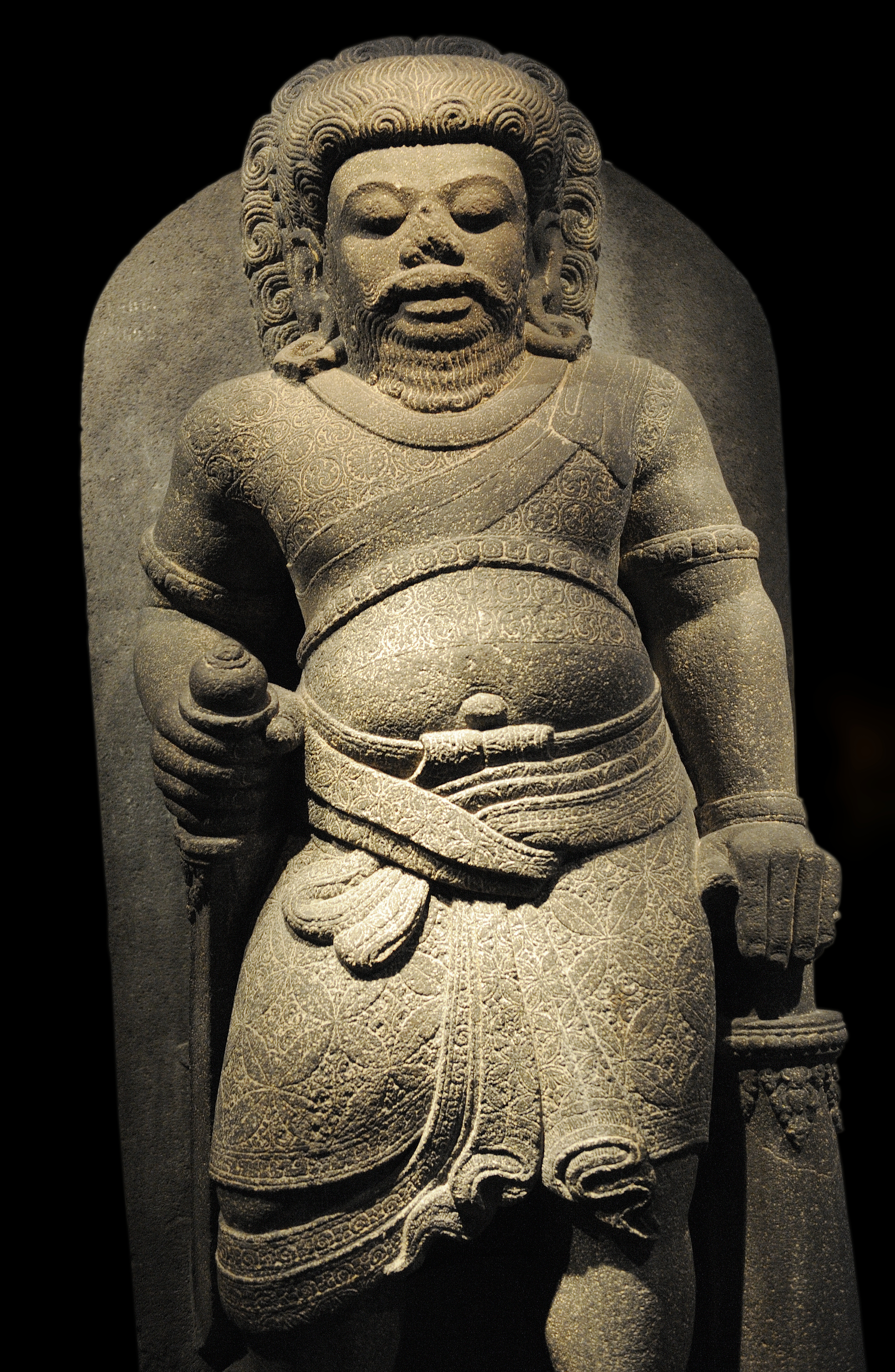
Kawung batik motif on Mahakala statue, from temple at Singhasari, East Java, 1275–1300

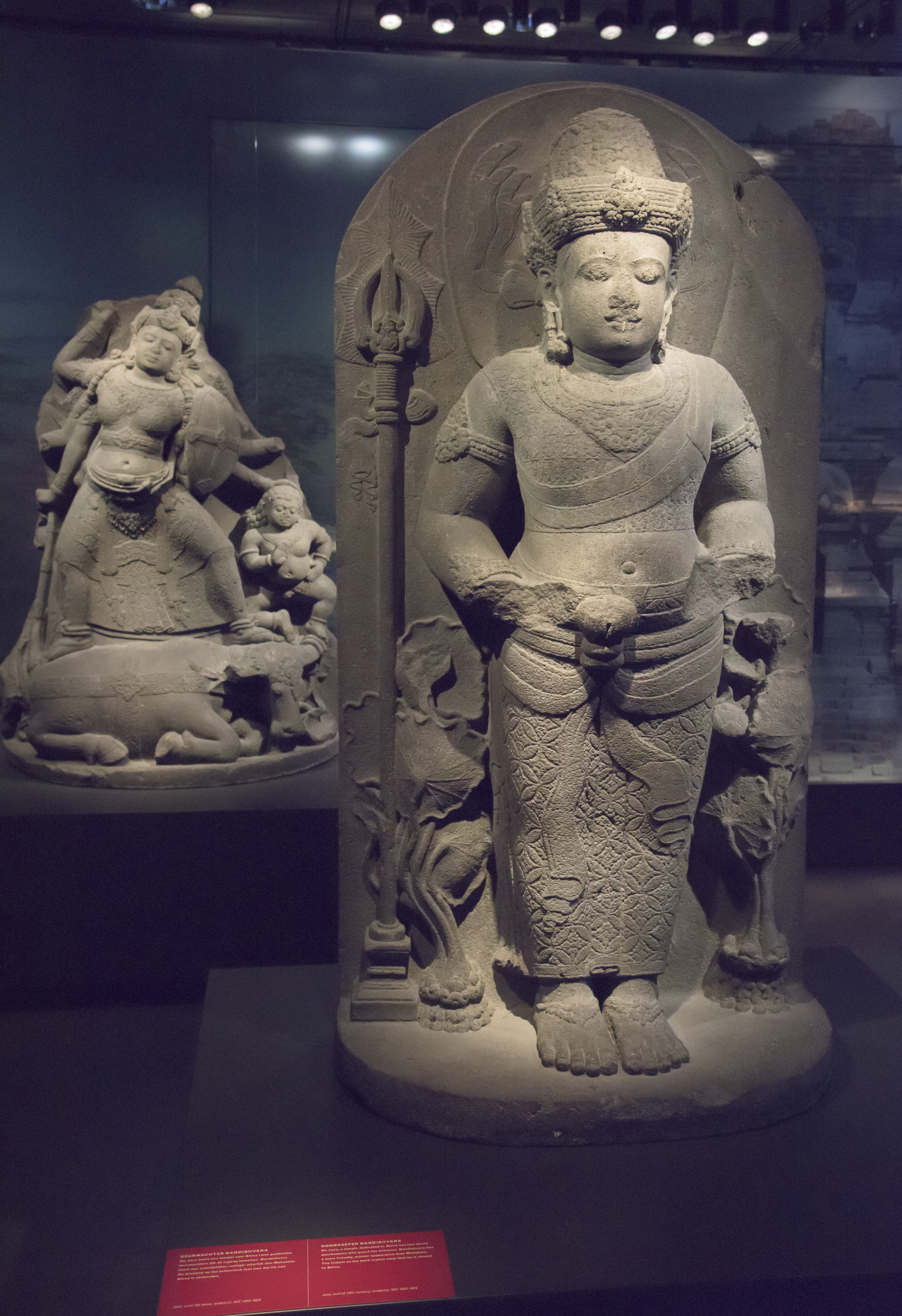
Kawung batik motif on Nandishvara statue (foreground, 13th century)

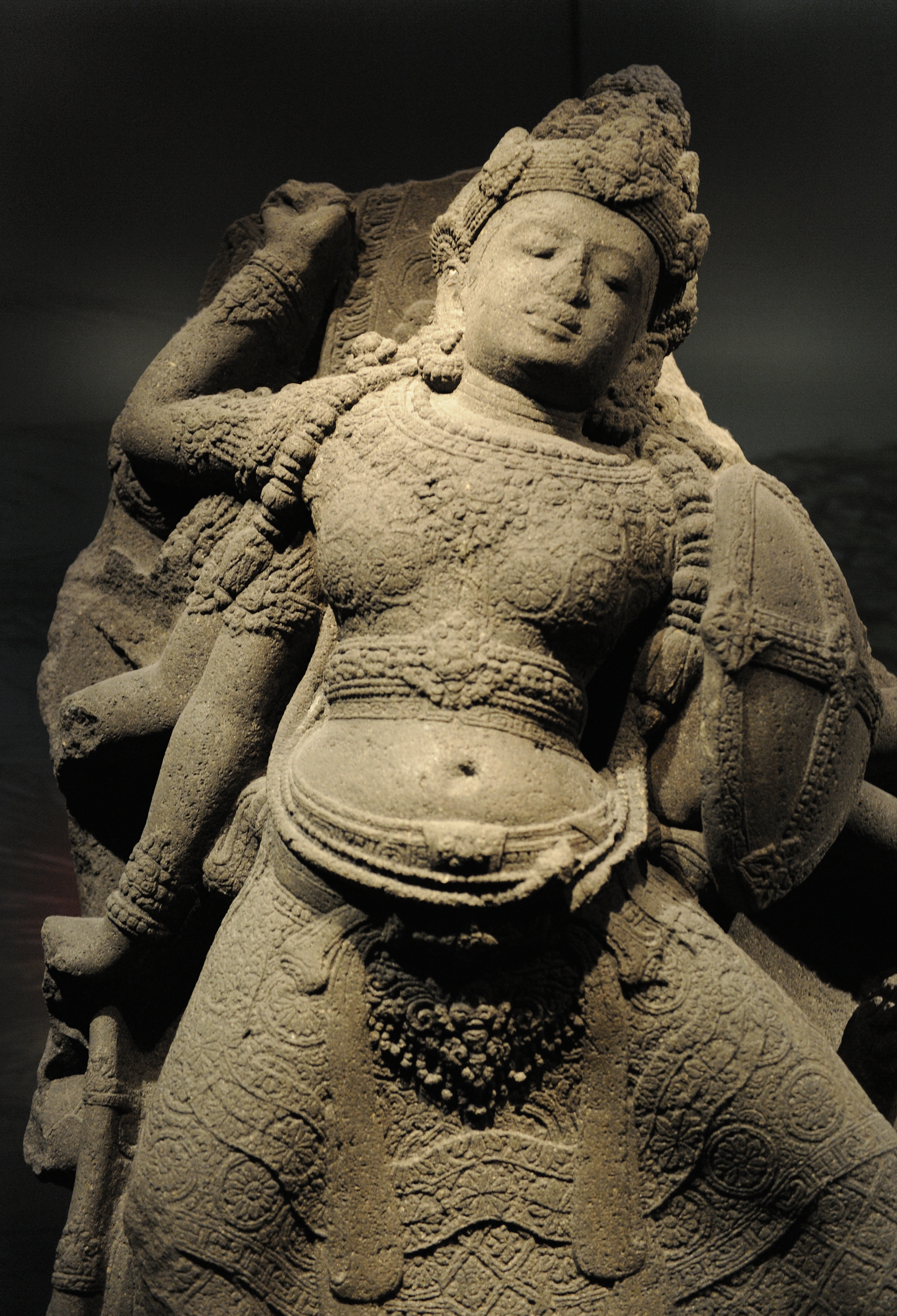
Batik motif on Durga Mahishasuramardini statue, Singhasari, 1275–1300

=== Modern period ===
Batik technique became more widely known (particularly by Europeans) when Javanese batik was described for the first time in Thomas Stamford Raffles's 1817 The History of Java, which also marked the beginning of collecting and scholarly interest in batik traditions. In 1873 the Dutch merchant Van Rijckevorsel gave the pieces he collected during a trip to Indonesia to the ethnographic museum in Rotterdam. Examples were displayed at the Exposition Universelle at Paris in 1900. Today the Tropenmuseum houses the biggest collection of Indonesian batik in the Netherlands.

In the 19th to early 20th century, Dutch Indo–Europeans and Chinese settlers were actively involved in the production and development of Javanese batik, particularly pesisir "coastal" batik in the northern coast of Java, especially developed in Pekalongan City, Batik Elhasiq. They introduced innovations such as cap (copper block stamps) to mass-produce batiks, synthetic dyes which allow brighter colors, and new patterns which blended a number of cultural influences. Several prominent batik ateliers appeared, such as Oey Soe Tjoen and Eliza van Zuylen, and their products catered to a wide audience in the Malay Archipelago (encompassing modern Indonesia, Malaysia, and Singapore). Batik skirts and sarongs for example were widely worn by indigenous, Chinese, and European women of the region, paired with the ubiquitous kebaya shirt. Batik was also used for more specialized application, for example peranakan altar cloth called 桌帷 tok wi. It is in this time period that the influence of Javanese batik spread. In Subsaharan Africa, Javanese batik was introduced in the 19th century by Dutch and English merchants. It was subsequently modified by local artisans with larger motifs, thicker lines, and more colours into what is now known as African wax prints. Modern West African versions also use cassava starch, rice paste, or mud as a resist. In the 1920s, Javanese batik makers migrating to the eastern coast of Malay Peninsula introduced batik production using stamp blocks.

Many traditional ateliers in Java collapsed immediately following the Second World War and Indonesian wars of independence, but many workshops and artisans are still active today creating a wide range of products. They still continue to influence a number of textile traditions and artists. In the 1970s for example, batik was introduced to Australia, where aboriginal artists at Ernabella have developed it as their own craft. The works of the English artist Thetis Blacker were influenced by Indonesian batik; she had worked in Yogyakarta's Batik Research Institute and had travelled in Bali.

== Types ==
As each region of Indonesia has its own traditional pattern, batiks are commonly distinguished by the region they originated in, such as batik Solo, batik Yogyakarta, Pekalongan, and batik Madura. Batiks from Java can be distinguished by their general pattern and colours into batik pedalaman (inland batik) or batik pesisiran (coastal batik). Batiks which do not fall neatly into one of these two categories are classified by their region. A clustering of batik designs from all parts of Indonesia by degree of similarity indicates a history of cultural assimilation.

=== Javanese batik ===
==== Inland batik ====
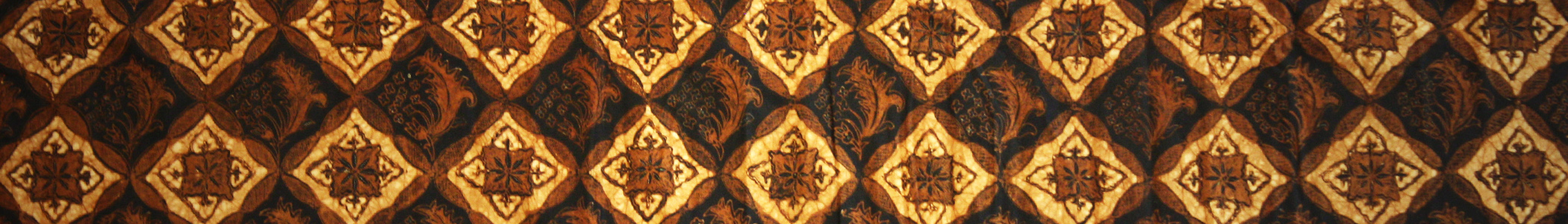
A typical inland batik has deep earthy colours with indigenous patterns (contemporary kain panjang with sidha pattern from Solo).

Inland batik, batik pedalaman or batik kraton (Javanese court batik) is the oldest batik tradition in Java. Inland batik has an earth colour such as black, indigo, brown, and sogan (a yellow from the tree Peltophorum pterocarpum), sometimes against a white background, with symbolic patterns that are mostly free from outside influence. Certain patterns are worn and preserved by the royal courts, while others are worn on specific occasions. At a Javanese wedding for example, the bride wears specific patterns at each stage of the ceremony. Noted inland batiks are produced in Solo and Jogjakarta, cities traditionally regarded as the centre of Javanese culture. Batik Solo typically has a sogan background and is used by the Susuhunan and Mangkunegaran Courts. Batik Jogja typically has a white background and is used by the Yogyakarta Sultanate and the Pakualaman Court.

==== Coastal batik ====
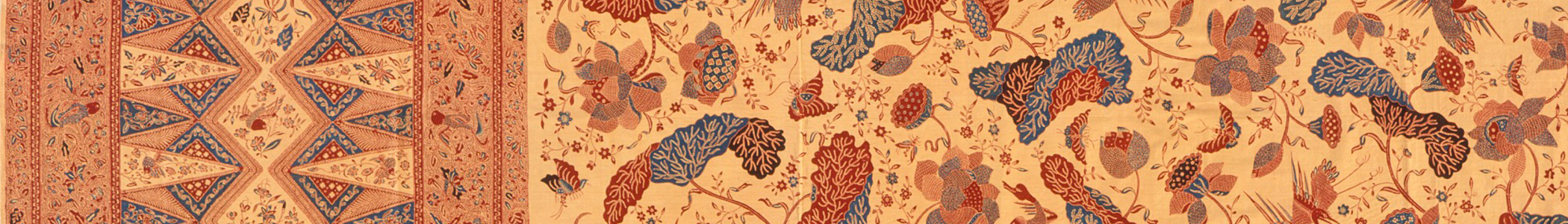
In contrast, a typical coastal batik has vibrant colours with patterns drawn from numerous cultures (kain panjang with lotus motifs from Semarang, 1880).

Coastal batik or batik pesisiran is produced in several areas of northern Java and Madura. In contrast to inland batik, coastal batik has vibrant colours and patterns inspired by a wide range of cultures as a consequence of maritime trading. Recurring motifs include European flower bouquets, Chinese phoenix, and Persian peacocks. Noted coastal batiks are produced in Pekalongan, Cirebon, Lasem, Tuban, and Madura; out of these, Pekalongan has the most active batik industry.

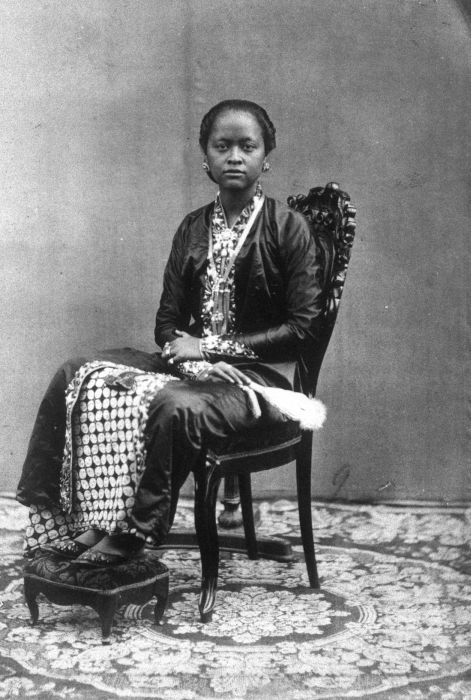
Princess Raden Ayu Mursilah wearing Kebaya and Batik from the Keraton Yogyakarta Hadiningrat, c. 1870

Jawa Hokokai, named after Hōkōkai (ジャワ奉公会), a Japanese-led organization of locals for war-cooperation, is not attributed to a particular region. During the Japanese occupation of the Dutch East Indies in the early 1940s, the batik industry greatly declined due to material shortages. The workshops funded by the Japanese however were able to produce extremely fine Jawa Hokokai batiks. Common Hokokai motifs include Japanese cherry blossoms (sakura), butterflies, and chrysanthemums.

An example coastal batik called tiga negeri ([batik of] three lands) is attributed to three regions: Lasem, Pekalongan, and Solo, where the batik is dyed in red, blue, and sogan dyes respectively. As of 1980, tiga negeri was only produced in one city.

==== Cirebon-Indramayu batik ====
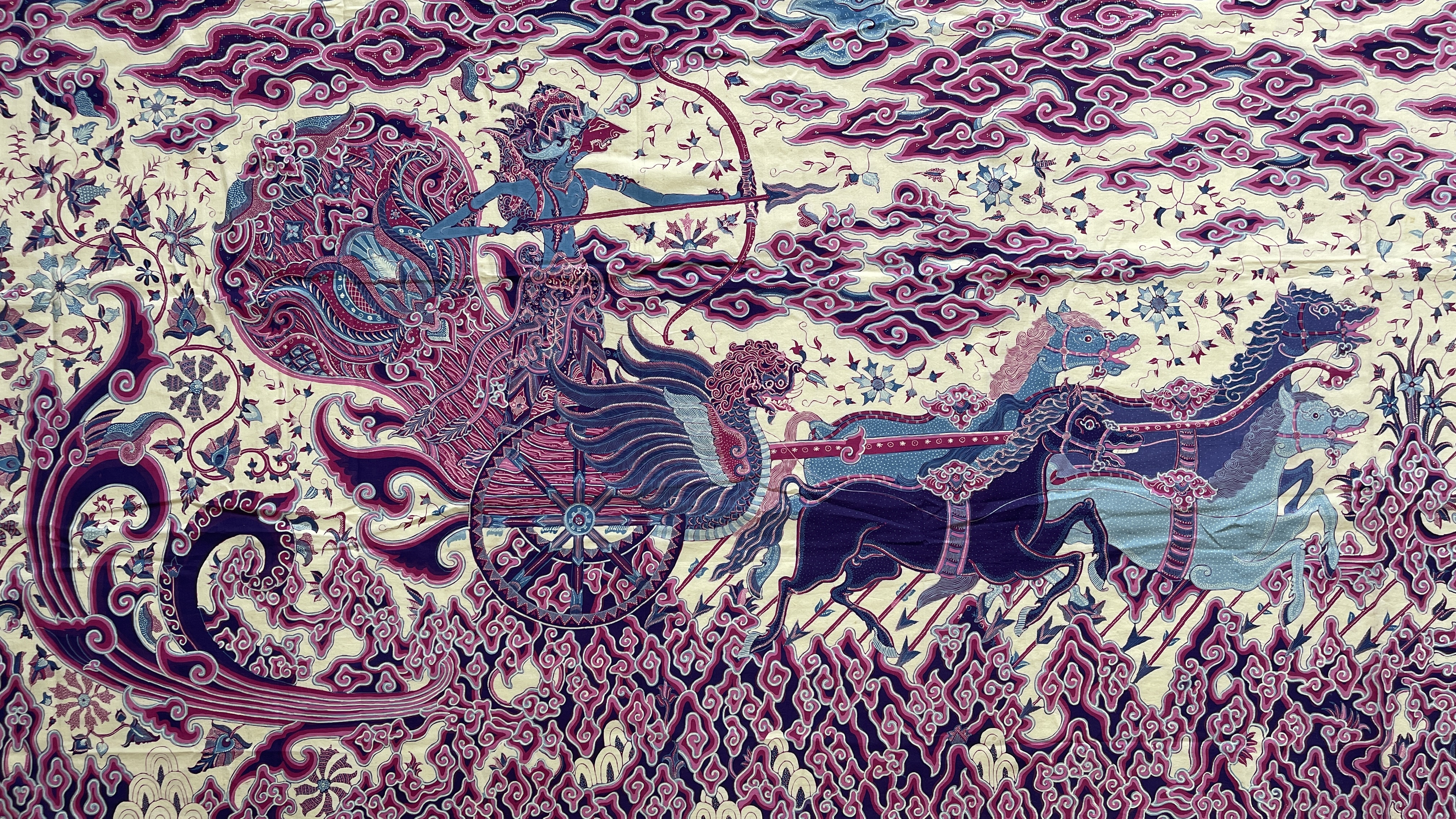
Cirebon batik from c. 1747 featuring the Megamendung and Wayang motifs.

Cirebon-Indramayu Javanese batik is a traditional cultural Cirebon and Indramayu Javanese-style of batik. The batik is native to the northwestern coastal region of the Indonesian island of Java, specifically within the Western Java cities of Cirebon and Indramayu. Cirebon-Indramayu Javanese batik is one of the indigenous Java-origin batiks; it is well-known for its vibrant colors and distinctive motifs that reflect the rich cultural heritage of the Javanese people in Cirebon and Indramayu.

Since 2021, as part of Indonesia's cultural heritage preservation efforts, the Government of Indonesia, through the Ministry of Education, Culture, Research, and Technology, has initiated the digitization and official inscription of Cirebon and Indramayu batik as an element of the nation's intangible cultural heritage. The designation identifies Cirebon and Indramayu as the associated geographical indication, it is protected under national laws.

=== Sundanese batik ===
So-called Sundanese or Parahyangan Batik is made in the Parahyangan region of West Java and Banten. Baduy batik only employs indigo in shades from bluish black to deep blue. It is traditionally worn by Outer Baduy people of Lebak Regency, Banten as iket, a type of Sundanese head-dress similar to the Balinese udeng. Bantenese batik employs bright pastel colours and represents a revival of a lost art from the Sultanate of Banten, rediscovered through archaeological work during 2002–2004. Twelve motifs from locations such as Surosowan have been identified.

=== Malay batik ===
Trade between the Melayu Kingdom in Jambi and Javanese coastal cities has thrived since the 13th century. Therefore, coastal batik from northern Java probably influenced Jambi. In 1875, Haji Mahibat from Central Java revived the declining batik industry in Jambi. The village of Mudung Laut in Pelayangan district produces batik Jambi. Batik Jambi and Javanese batik influenced the Malaysian batik.

The batik from Bengkulu on the west coast of Sumatra is called batik besurek, meaning "batik with letters, calligraphic batik" as it draws inspiration from Arabic calligraphy.

=== Minangkabau batik ===
The Minangkabau people of West Sumatra produce batik called batiak tanah liek (clay batik). This uses clay as dye for the fabric. The fabric is immersed in clay for more than one day and then inscribed with motifs of animals and plants.

=== Balinese batik ===
Batik making in the island of Bali is a relatively new but fast-growing industry. Many patterns are inspired by local designs. Motifs include objects from nature such as frangipani and hibiscus flowers, birds, and fishes; daily activities such as Balinese dance and ngaben processions; and mythological creatures such as barong, kala and winged lions. Modern batik artists express themselves freely in a wide range of subjects.

Contemporary batik is not limited to traditional or ritual use in Bali. Some designers promote Balinese batik as an elegant fabric. High class batik, like handmade batik tulis, can denote social status.

=== Madurese batik ===
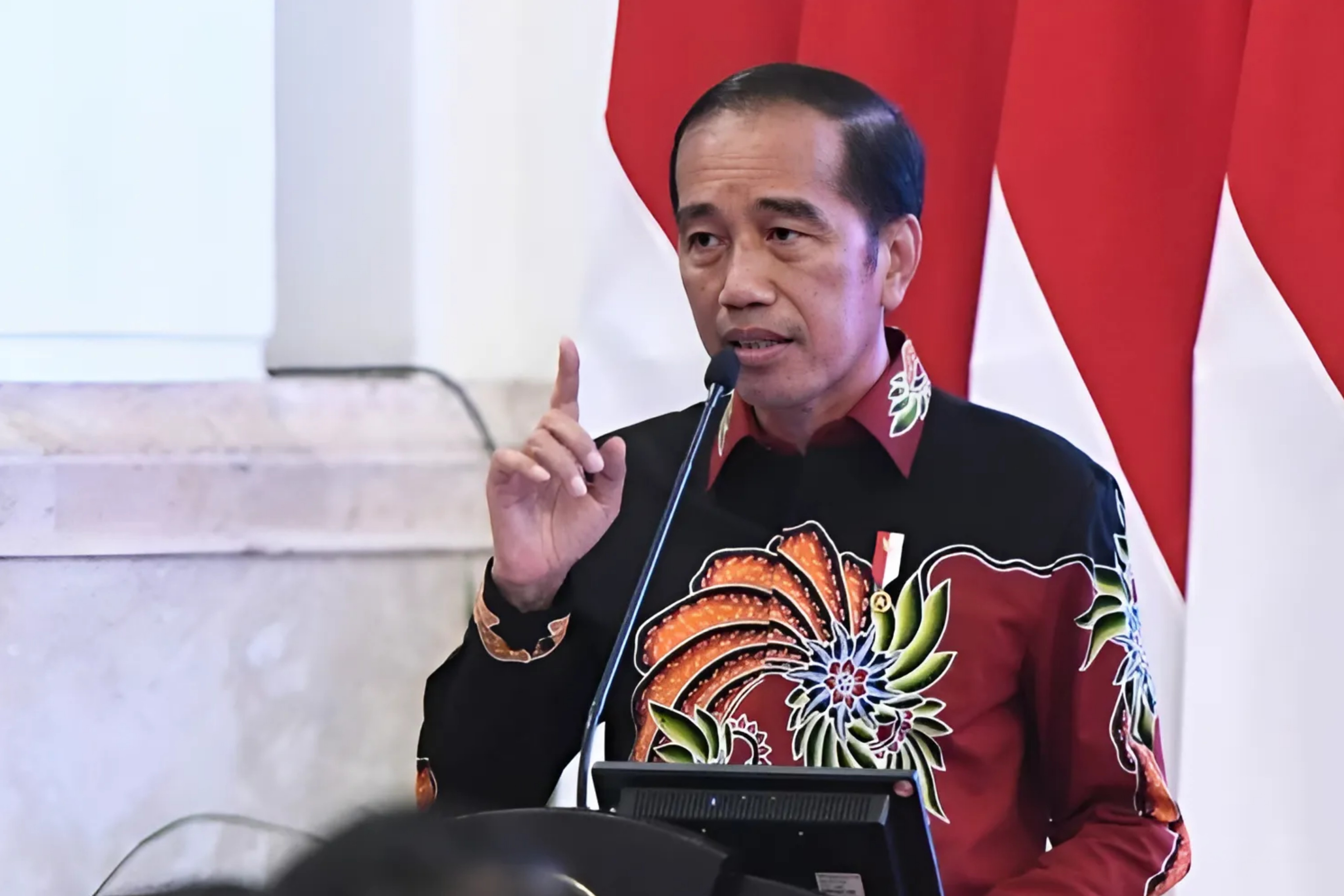
Joko Widodo, 7th President of Indonesia, wearing contemporary Madurese batik.

Madurese batik is a traditional cultural Madurese-style of batik. Native to the easternmost coastal region of the Indonesian island of Java and Madura, Madurese batik is one of the indigenous Eastern Java-origin batiks. It is well-known for its fusion (both earth tone and vibrant) colors and distinctive motifs that reflect the rich cultural heritage of the Madurese (incl. Pendalungan Madurese and Bawean Madurese) people in eastern part of Java, Madura, and Bawean.

Since 2013, as part of Indonesia's cultural heritage preservation efforts, the Government of Indonesia, through the Ministry of Education, Culture, Research, and Technology, initiated the digitization and official inscription of Madurese batik as an element of the nation's intangible cultural heritage. The designation identified Madura (and East Java in general) as the associated geographical indication, and protected it under national laws.

== Culture ==
Batik is widespread in Indonesia. Written batik has a cultural dimension that contains prayer, hope, and lessons. Batik motifs in ancient Javanese society had a symbolic meaning, indicating a person's level in society.

Infants are carried in batik slings decorated with symbols designed to bring the child luck; other designs are reserved for brides and bridegrooms, and their families. Batik garments play a central role in Javanese rituals, such as the ceremonial casting of royal batik into a volcano. In the Javanese naloni mitoni ceremony, the mother-to-be is wrapped in seven layers of batik, wishing her good things. Batik is prominent in the tedak siten ceremony when a child touches the earth for the first time. Some patterns are reserved for traditional and ceremonial contexts.

Batik in 19th century Java, from The History of Java by Thomas Stamford Raffles (1817)

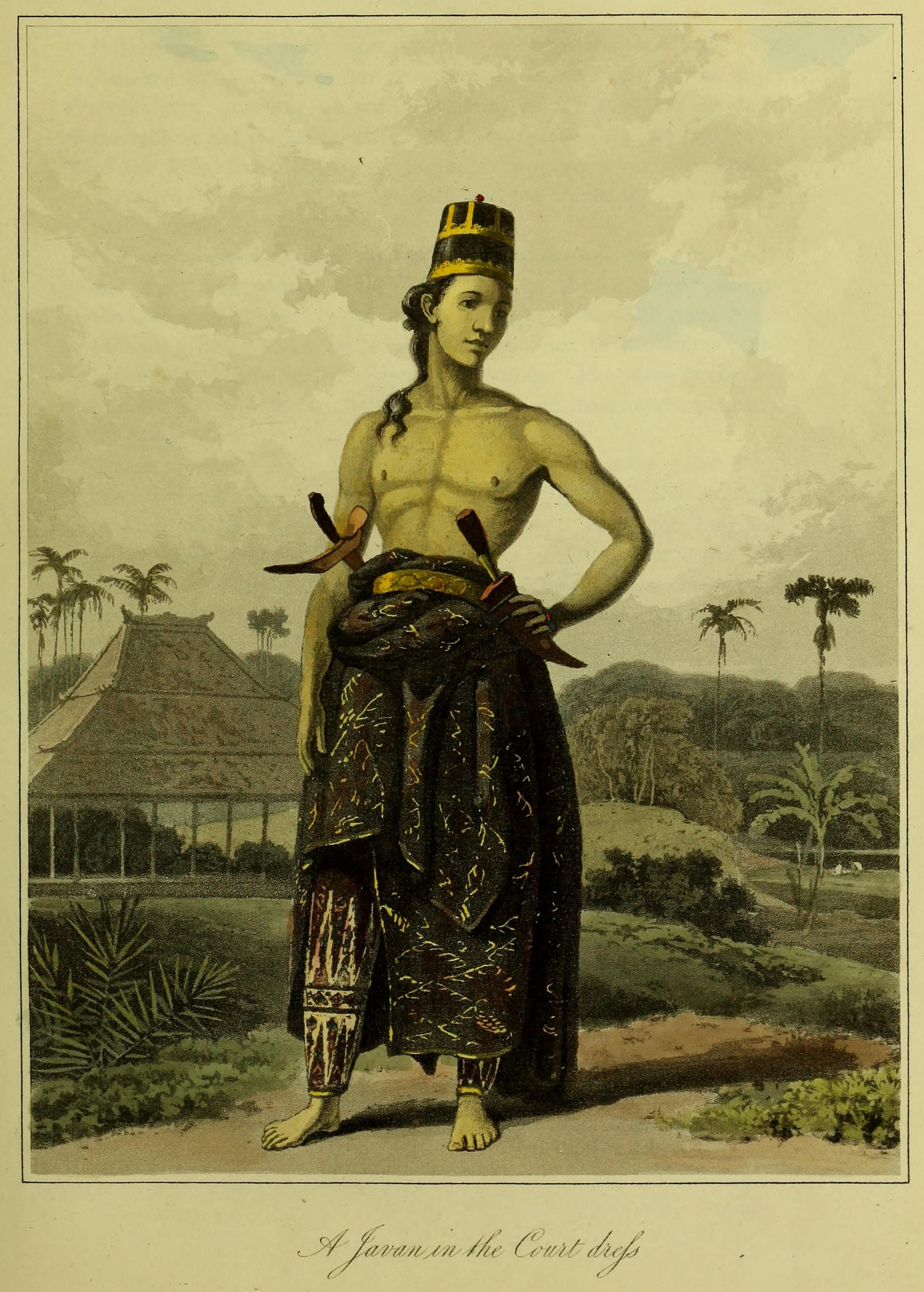
A Javanese man in court dress

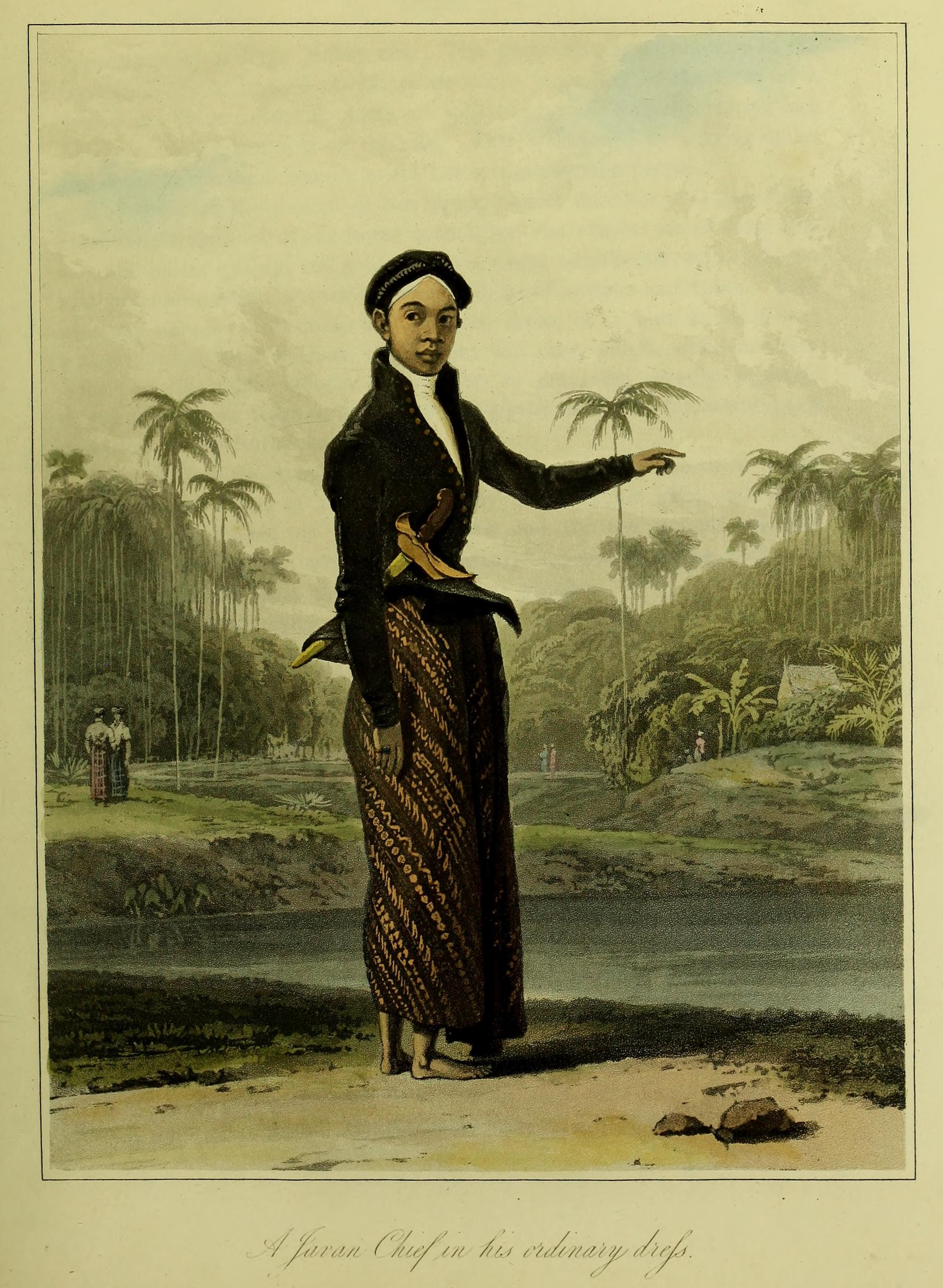
A Javanese chief, in his ordinary dress

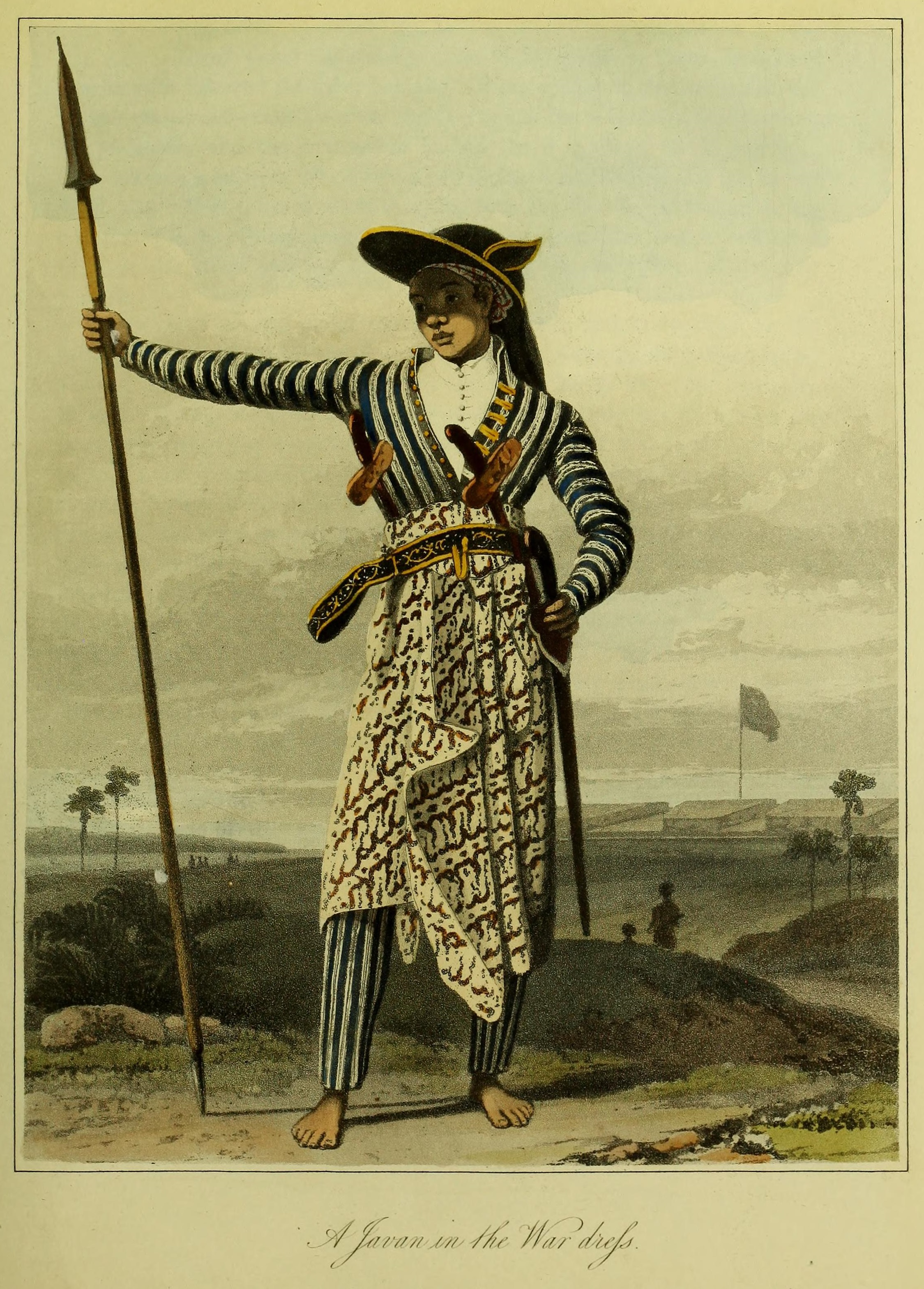
A Javanese man in war dress

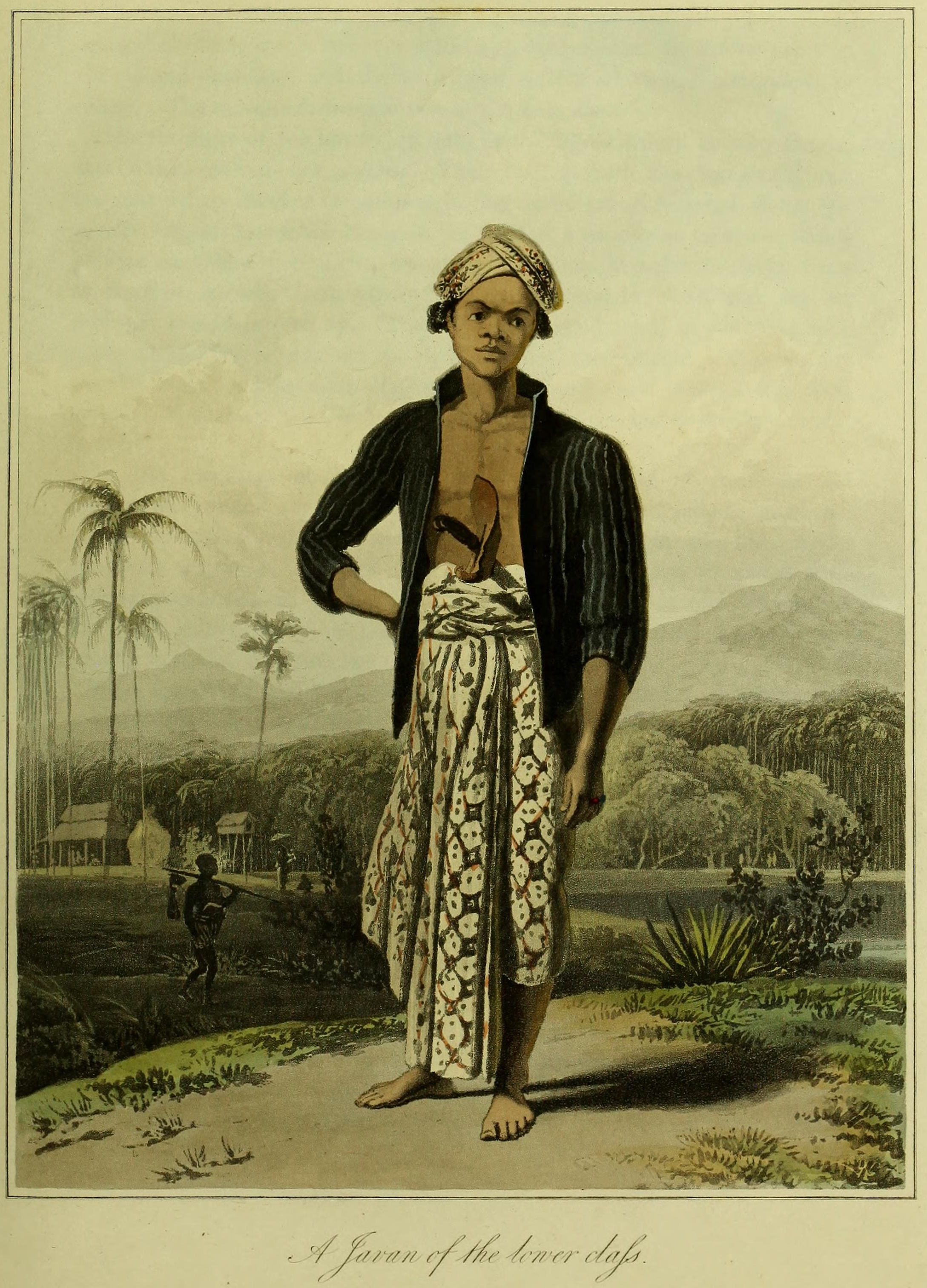
A Javanese man of the lower class

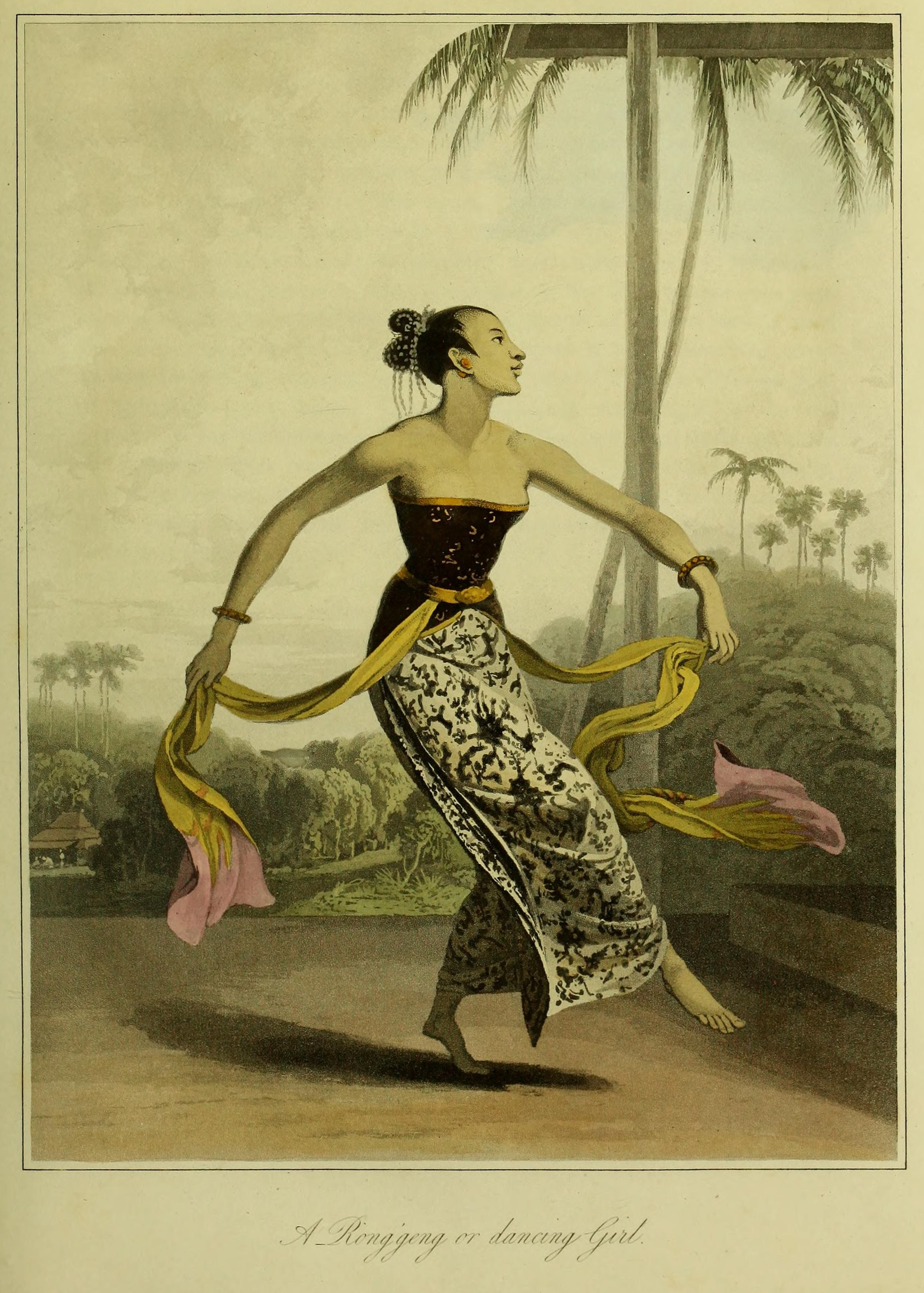
A Javanese ronggeng dancer

=== Traditional costume in the Javanese royal palace ===
Batik is the traditional costume of the royal and aristocratic families in Java. The use of batik remains a mandatory traditional dress in the Javanese palaces. Initially, the tradition of making batik was only practiced in the palace, and was reserved for the clothes of the king, his family, and their followers, thus becoming a symbol of Javanese feudalism. Because many of the king's followers lived outside the palace, batik came outside the palace. The motifs of the Parang Rusak, semen gedhe, kawung, and udan riris are used by the aristocrats and courtiers in garebeg ceremonies, pasowanan, and welcoming honoured guests. During the colonial era, Javanese courts required certain patterns to be worn according to a person's rank and class within society. Sultan Hamengkubuwono VII, who ruled the Yogyakarta Sultanate from 1921 to 1939, reserved patterns such as the Parang Rusak and Semen Agung for the Yogyakartan royal family, forbidding commoners from wearing them.

Batik in the royal palace

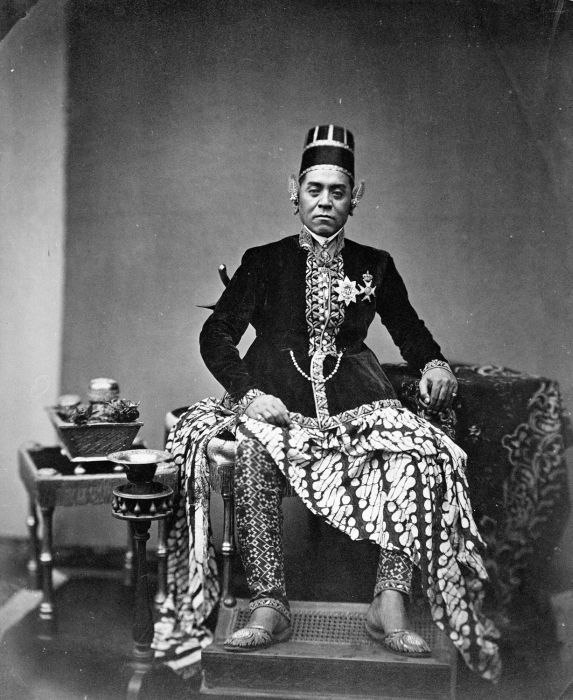
Sultan Hamengkubuwono VI, King of Yogyakarta Sultanate (1855–1877), dressed in royal majesty attire (batik)

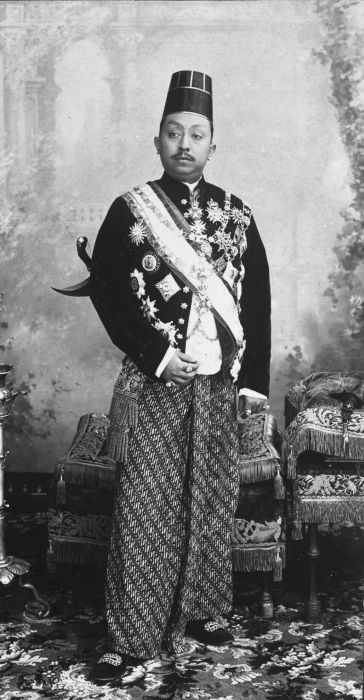
Pakubuwono X, the King of Surakarta Sunanate in kain batik, c. 1910

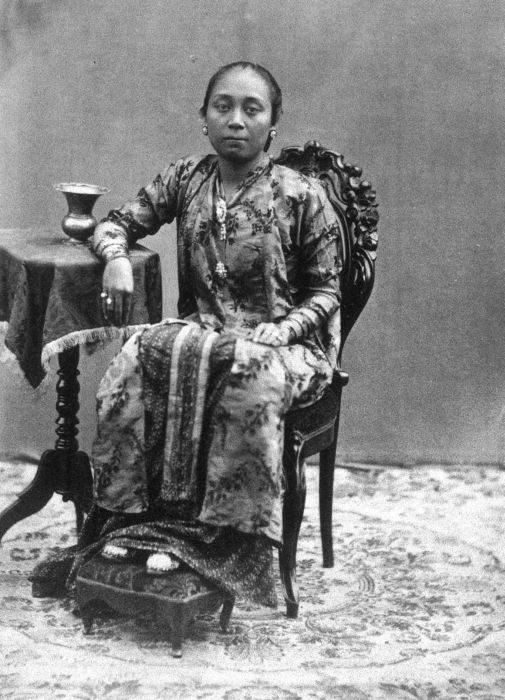
The Ratoe Kedaton wearing batik, the head wife of Hamengkubuwono V of Kraton Ngayogyakarta Hadiningrat, c. 1865

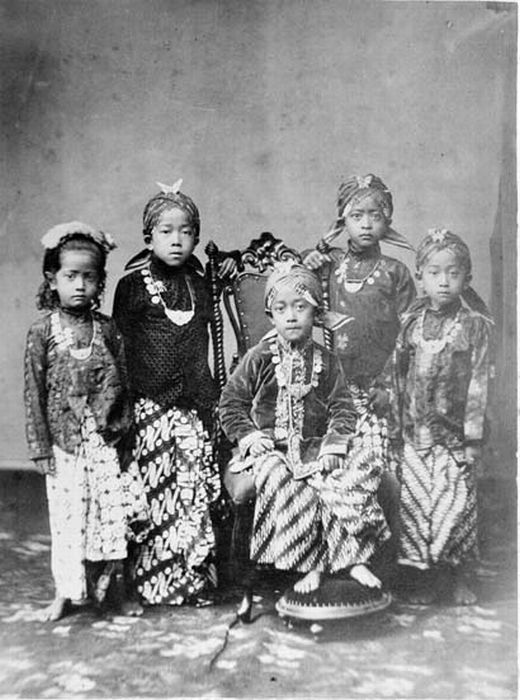
Princes and princess wearing batik of Kraton Ngayogyakarta Hadiningrat, c. 1870

=== Traditional dance costumes ===
Batik is used for traditional Javanese dance performances. It is worn for instance for the Ramayana Ballet at the Prambanan temple.

Dancers' batik dress

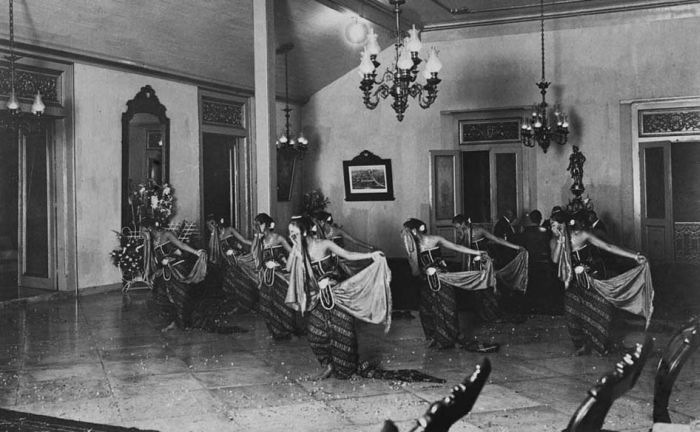
Bedhaya dance performance at Mangkunegaran royal palace at Solo, Java, in January 1921

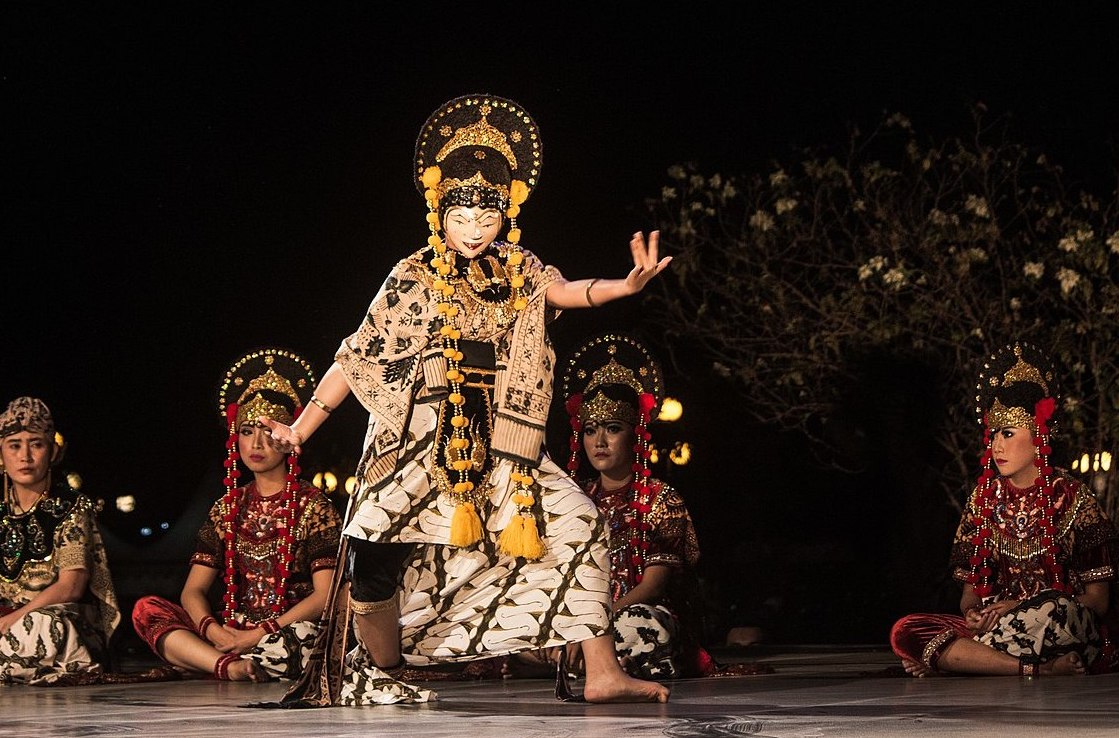
Topeng dance performance from Cirebon, West Java, Indonesia

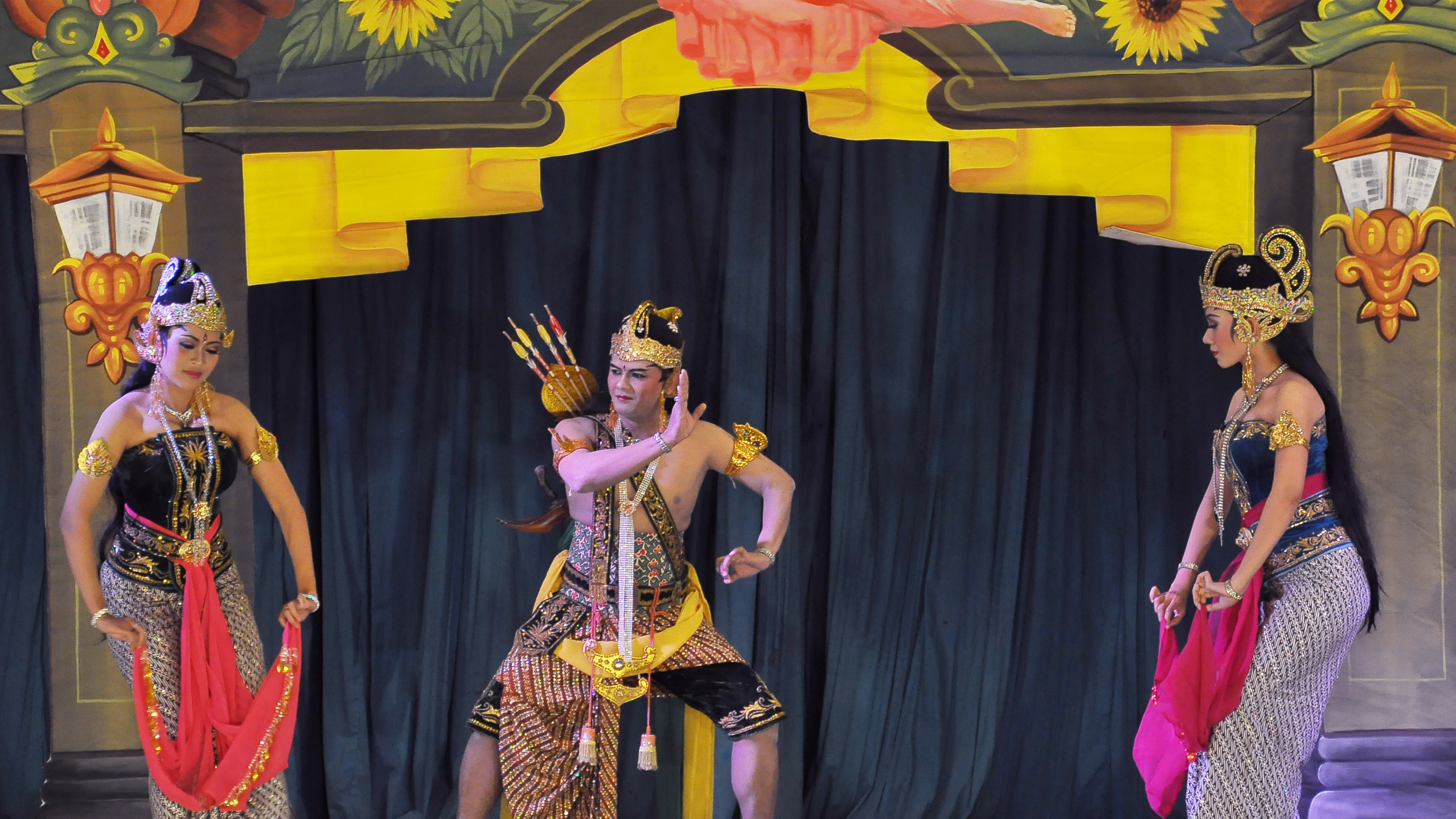
King Duryodana in Wayang wong performance in Taman Budaya Rahmat Saleh, Semarang, Jawa Tengah, Indonesia

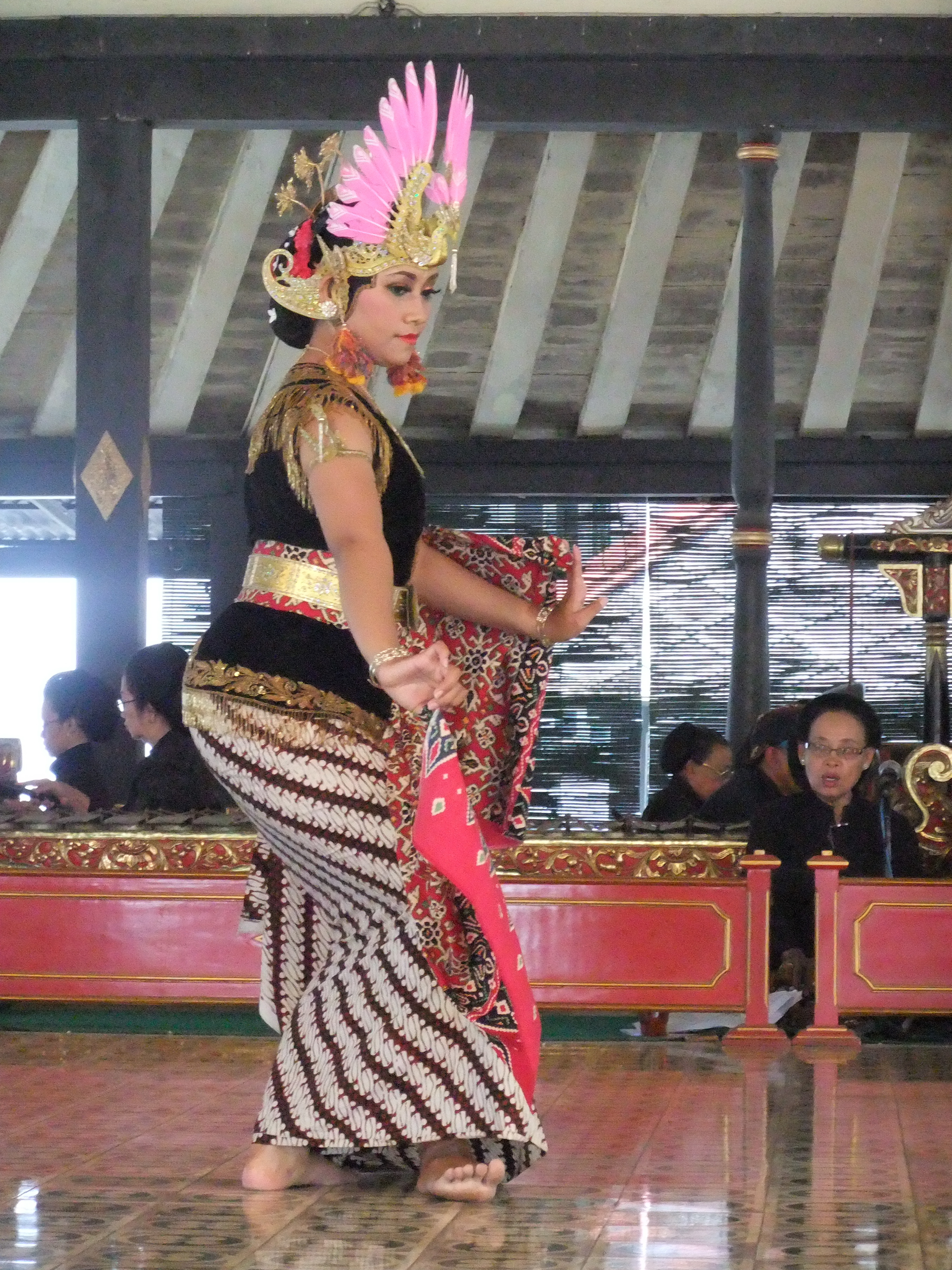
Golek Ayun-Ayun Dance performance accompanied by Gamelan Ensemble at Bangsal Sri Manganti Keraton Yogyakarta

=== Birth ceremonies ===
In Javanese tradition, when a mother-to-be reaches the seventh month of pregnancy, a mitoni ceremony is held, where she has to put on the seven kebayas and seven batik cloths. Each batik cloth has a high philosophical value which is also a strand and hope for the Almighty so that the baby who is born has a good personality.

=== Wedding ceremonies ===
Every motif in classical Javanese batik has its own meaning and philosophy, including for wedding ceremonies. In the Javanese wedding ceremony, certain designs are reserved for brides and bridegrooms, as well as their families. The truntum flower motif in the shape of the su) is used for midodareni ceremony (the procession of the night before the wedding ceremony, symbolizing the last night before the child separates from parents). This motif is also used during the panggih ceremony (the procession when the bride and groom meet after being secluded) by the parents of the bride and groom. The truntum motif symbolises love that never ends.

Wedding batik

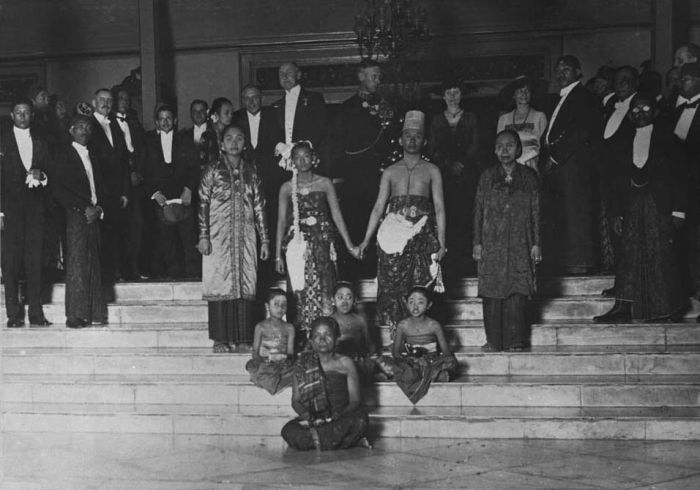
Javanese Royal wedding in Mangkunegaran royal palace, January 1921

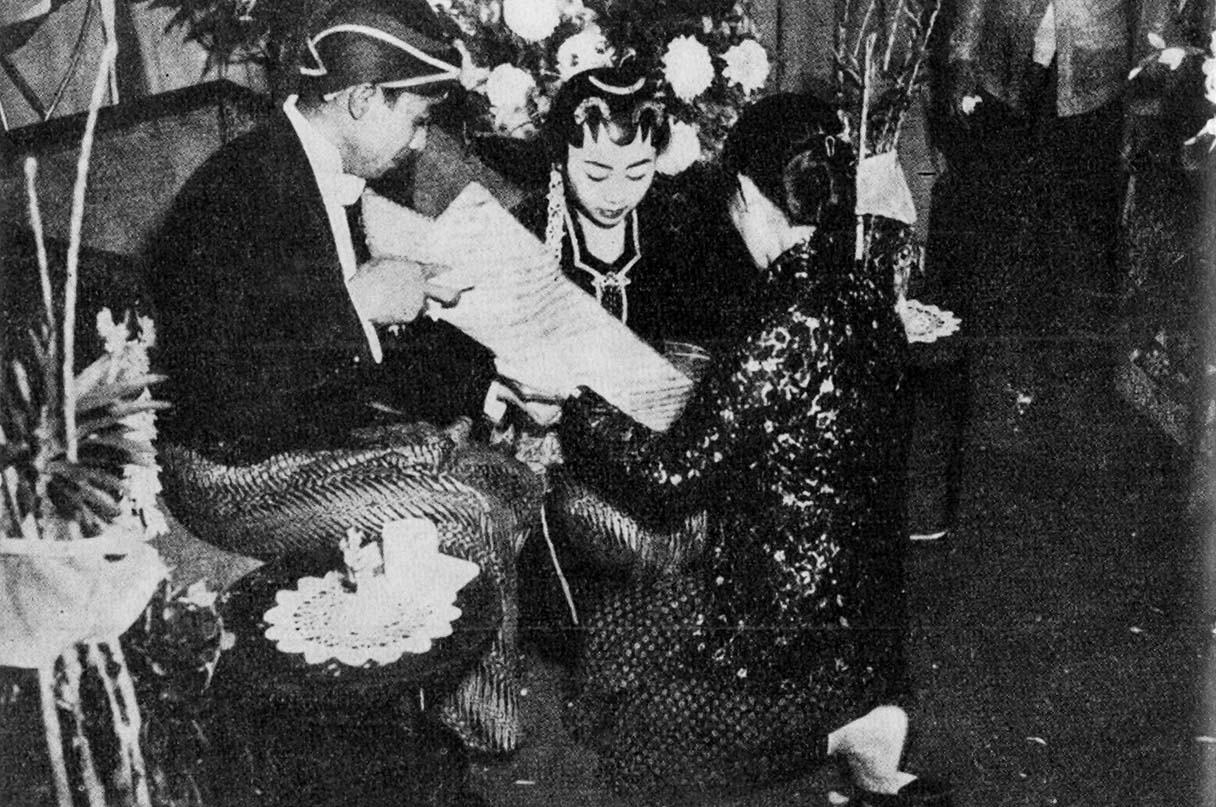
Kacar-kucur ceremony, groom pouring rice and coins into bride's scarf, c. 1960

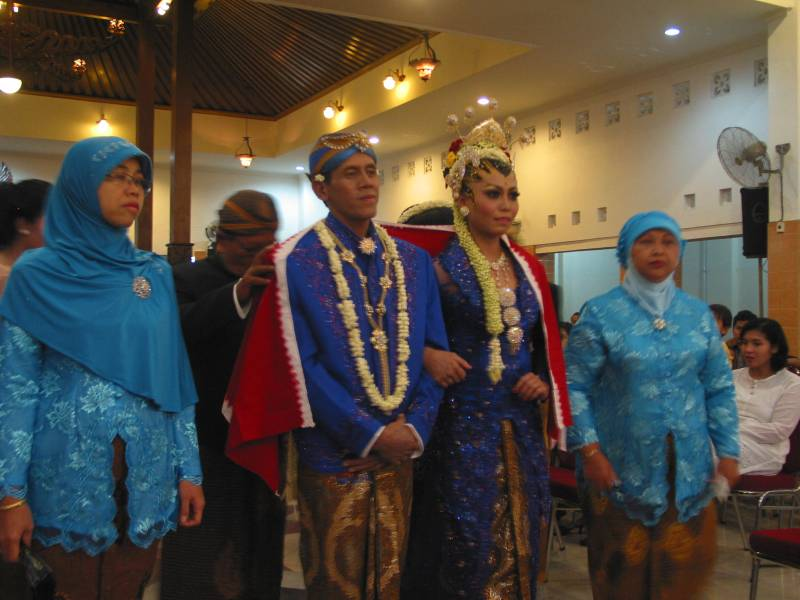
Panggih ceremony, meeting between bride and groom on their wedding day

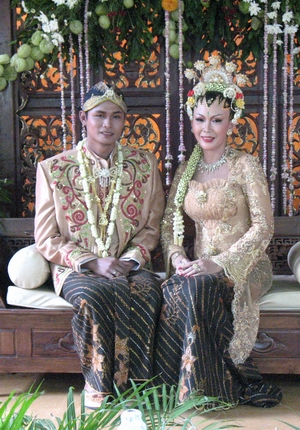
Batik in a traditional Javanese wedding ceremony.

=== Formal and informal daily dress ===
Contemporary practice often allows people to pick any pattern according to one's taste and preference from casual to formal situations, and batik makers modify, combine, or invent new iterations of well-known patterns. Batik has become a daily dress for work, school, and formal and informal events in Indonesia. Many young designers have started their fashion design work by taking batik as their inspiration. Their creativity has given birth to modern batik clothing.

Daily dress

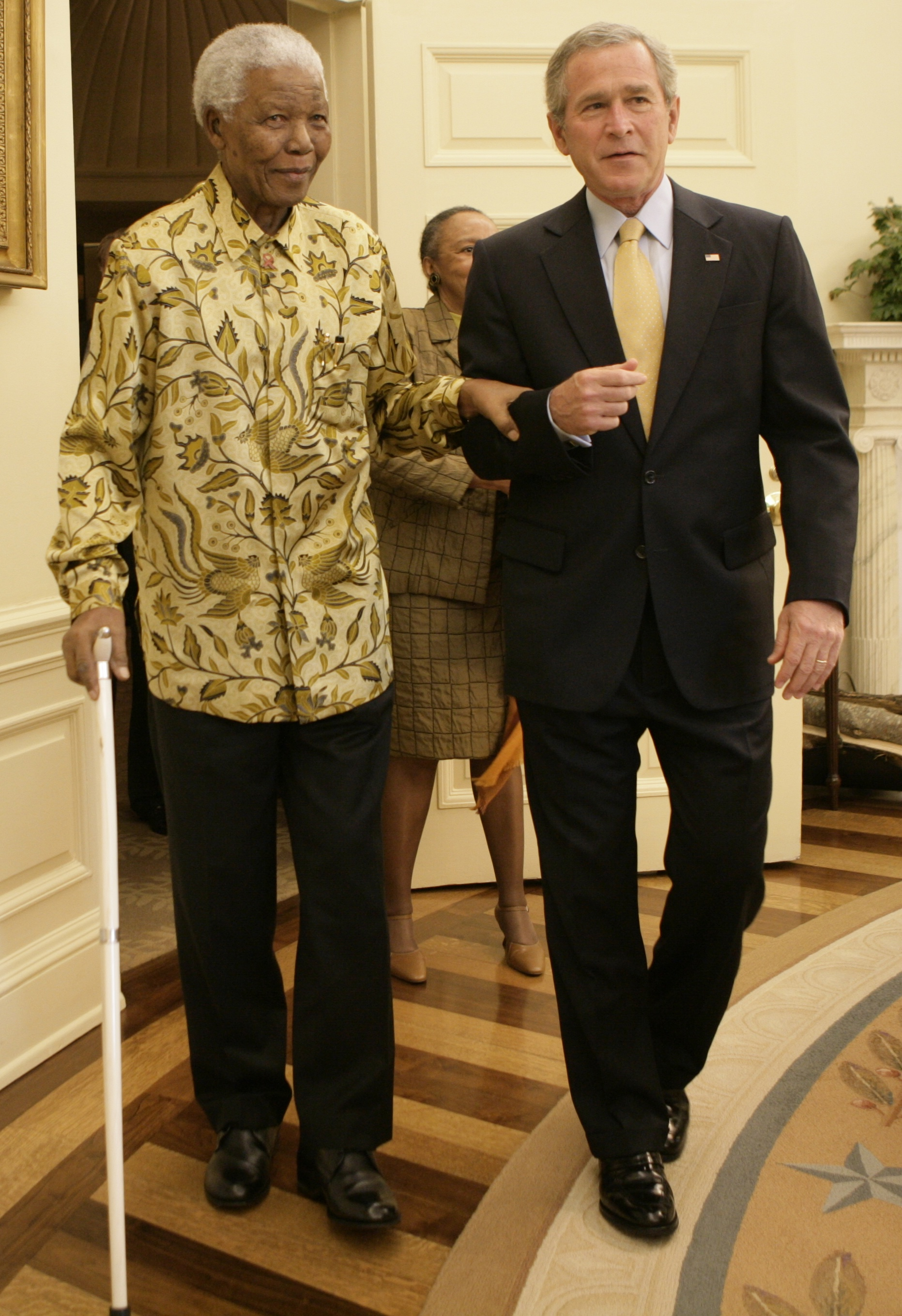
Nelson Mandela wearing batik

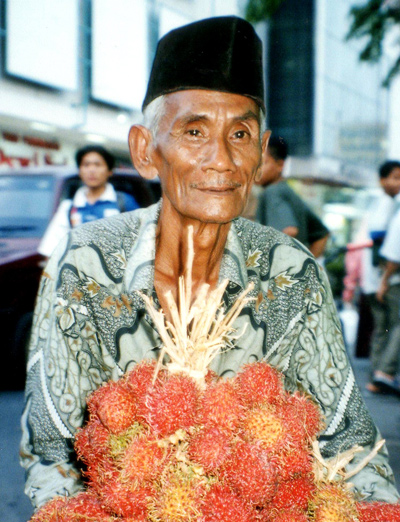
A Javanese man wearing typical contemporary batik shirt

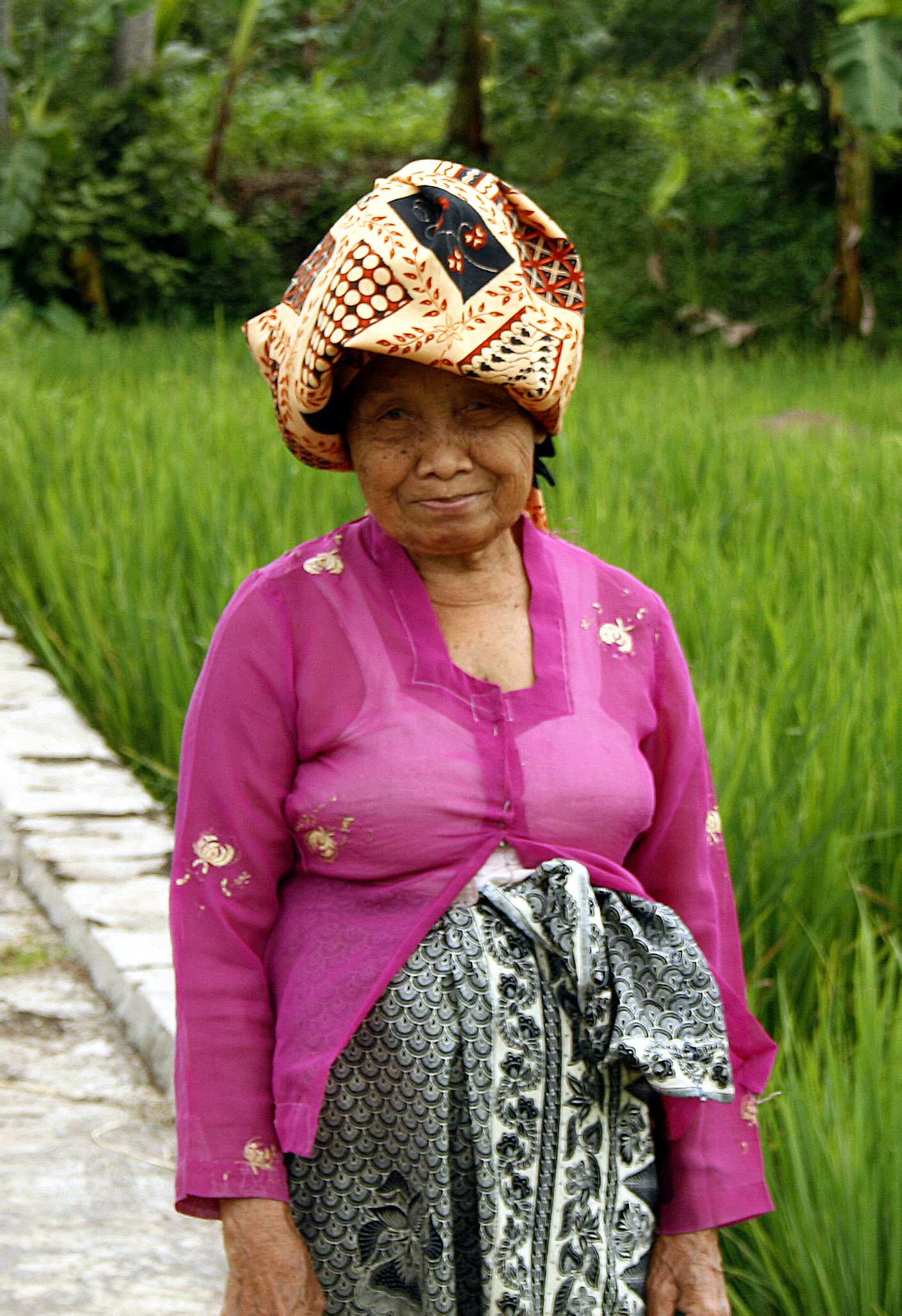
An elderly Sundanese woman wearing batik sarong and headdress

== Popularity ==
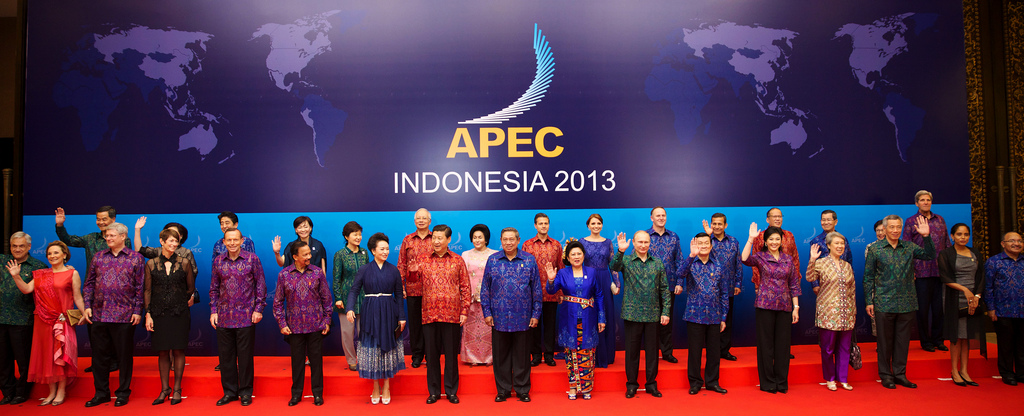
The leaders of APEC wearing batik at their 2013 meeting in Bali

The batik industry of Java flourished from the late 1800s to the early 1900s, but declined during the Japanese occupation of the Dutch East Indies. With increasing preference of western clothing, the batik industry further declined following the Indonesian independence. Batik has somewhat revived at the turn of the 21st century, through the efforts of Indonesian fashion designers to innovate batik by incorporating new colours, fabrics, and patterns. Batik has become a fashion item for many Indonesians, and may be seen on shirts, dresses, or scarves for casual wear; it is a preferred replacement for jacket-and-tie at certain receptions. Traditional batik sarongs are still used in many occasions.

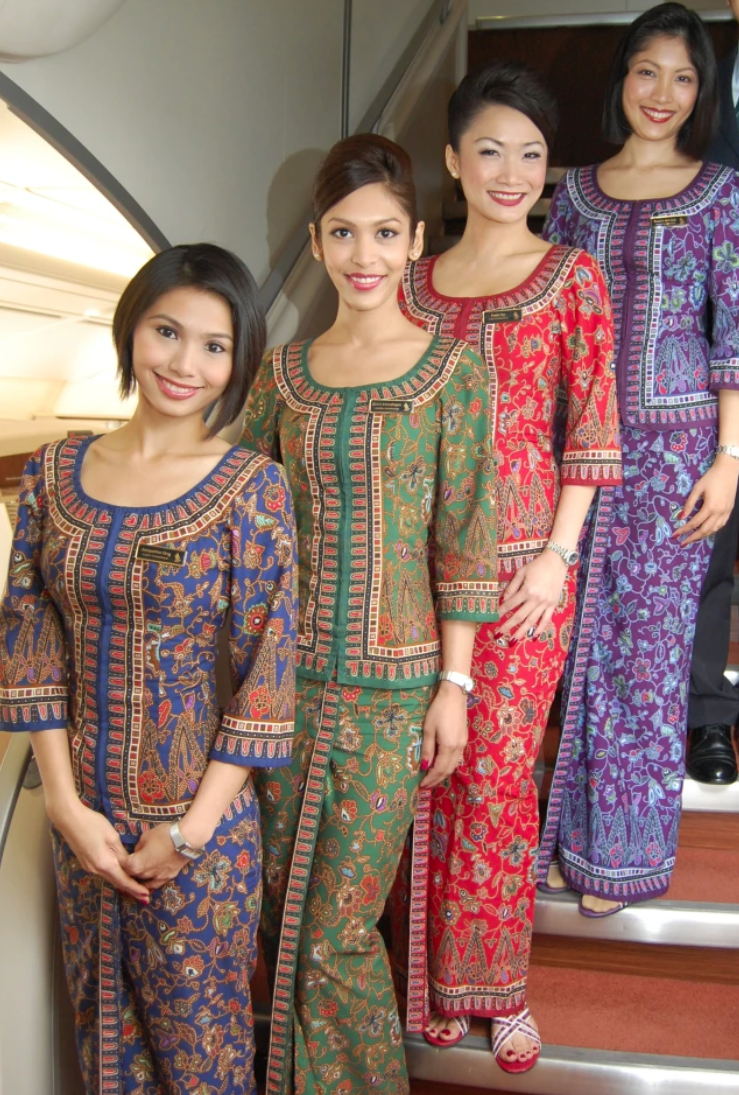
Singapore Airlines costumes, 2012

After the UNESCO recognition for Indonesian batik on 2 October 2009, the Indonesian administration asked Indonesians to wear batik on Fridays, and wearing batik every Friday has been encouraged in government offices and private companies ever since. 2 October is celebrated as National Batik Day in Indonesia. Batik had helped improve the small business local economy, batik sales in Indonesia had reached Rp 3.9 trillion (US$436.8 million) in 2010, an increase from Rp 2.5 trillion in 2006. The value of batik exports, meanwhile, increased from $14.3 million in 2006 to $22.3 million in 2010.

Batik is popular in the neighbouring countries of Singapore and Malaysia. It is produced in Malaysia with similar, but not identical, methods to those used in Indonesia. Batik is featured in the national airline uniforms of the three countries, represented by batik prints worn by flight attendants of Singapore Airlines, Garuda Indonesia and Malaysian Airlines. The female uniform of Garuda Indonesia flight attendants is a modern interpretation of the Kartini style kebaya with parang gondosuli motifs.

== Parts of the cloth ==
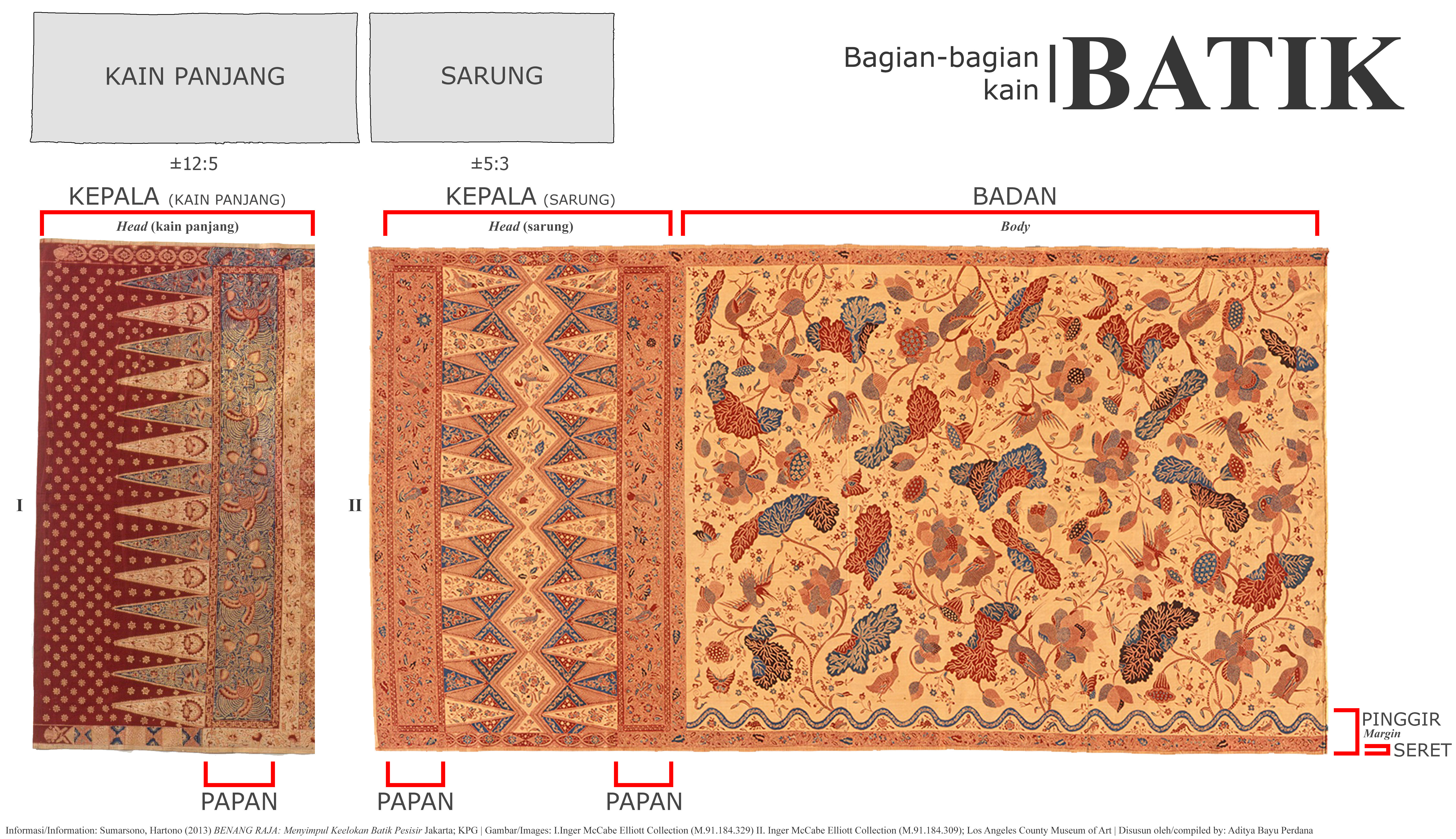
Names of the parts of an Indonesian batik sarong cloth

In Indonesia, batik is traditionally sold in 2.25-metre lengths used for kain panjang or sarong. It is worn by wrapping it around the hip, or made into a hat known as blangkon. The cloth can be filled continuously with a single pattern or divided into several sections. Certain patterns are only used in certain sections of the cloth. For example, a row of isosceles triangles, forming the pasung motif, as well as diagonal floral motifs called dhlorong, are commonly used for the head. However, pasung and dhlorong are occasionally found in the body. Other motifs such as buketan (flower bouquet) and birds are commonly used in either the head or the body.

- The head is a rectangular section of the cloth which is worn at the front of the sarong. The head section can be at the middle of the cloth, or placed at one or both ends. The papan inside of the head can be used to determine whether the cloth is kain panjang or sarong.
- The body is the main part of the cloth, and is filled with a wide variety of patterns. The body can be divided into two alternating patterns and colours called pagi-sore ('morning-evening'). Brighter patterns are shown during the day, while darker pattern are shown in the evening. The alternating colours give the impression of two batik sets.
- Margins are often plain, but floral and lace-like patterns, as well as wavy lines described as a dragon, are common in the area beside seret.

== Patterns and motifs ==
The patterns of batik textile are particular to the time, place, and culture of their producers. Indonesian batik patterns drew from a wide range of cultural influence (see table below) and are often symbolically rich. Some batik patterns are attributed with loaded meanings and deep philosophies, with their use reserved for special occasions or groups of peoples (e.g. nobles, royalties). Some scholars however note that existing literature on the subject of Indonesian textiles are prone to over-romanticize and exoticize purported 'meanings' behind mundane patterns. Some batik patterns were created simply to satisfy market demand and fashion trends.

Cultural influences on batik patterns and motifs
Cultural influences	Batik patterns	Geographic locations	Sample
Native Indonesian	Kawung, ceplok, gringsing, parang, lereng, truntum, sekar jagad (combination of motifs) and other decorative motifs such as of Javanese, Dayak, Batak, Papuan, Riau Malay.	Respective areas with their own patterns	
Hindu–Buddhist	Garuda, banji, cuwiri, kalpataru, meru or gunungan, semen rama, pringgondani, sidha asih, sidha mukti, sidha luhur	Java	
Islamic	Besurek or Arabic calligraphy, buraq	Bengkulu, Cirebon, Jambi	
Chinese	Burung hong (Chinese phoenix), liong (Chinese dragon), qilin, wadasan, megamendung (Chinese-style cloud), lok tjan	Lasem, Cirebon, Pekalongan, Tasikmalaya, Ciamis	
Indian	Jlamprang, peacock, elephant	Cirebon, Garut, Pekalongan, Madura	
European (colonial era)	Buketan (floral bouquet), European fairytale, colonial images such as house, horses, carriage, bicycle and European-dressed people	Java	
Japanese	sakura, hokokai, chrysanthemum, butterfly	Java	

== Batik museums ==
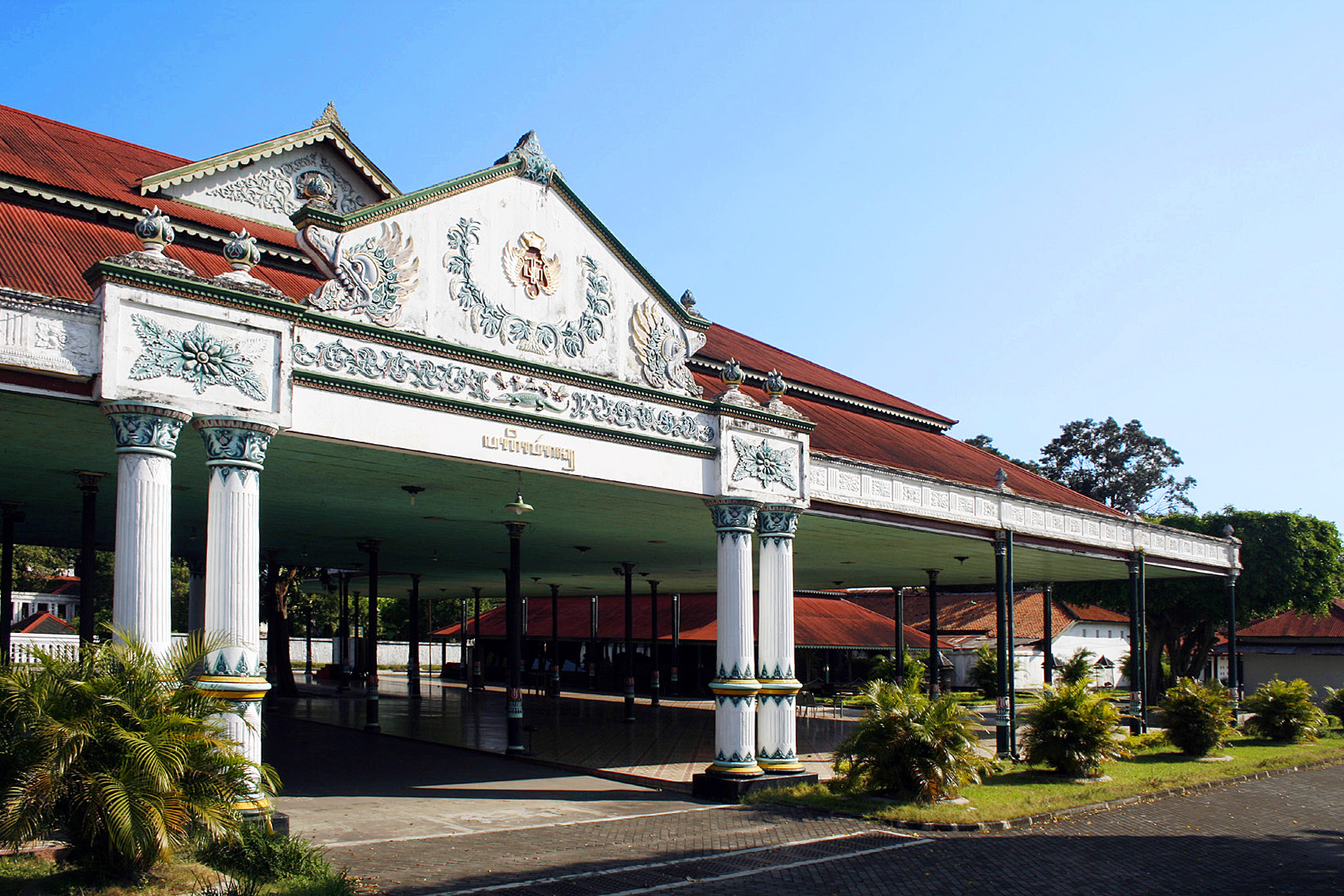
Museum Batik Keraton Yogyakarta lies in the Kraton Ngayogyakarta Hadiningrat complex.

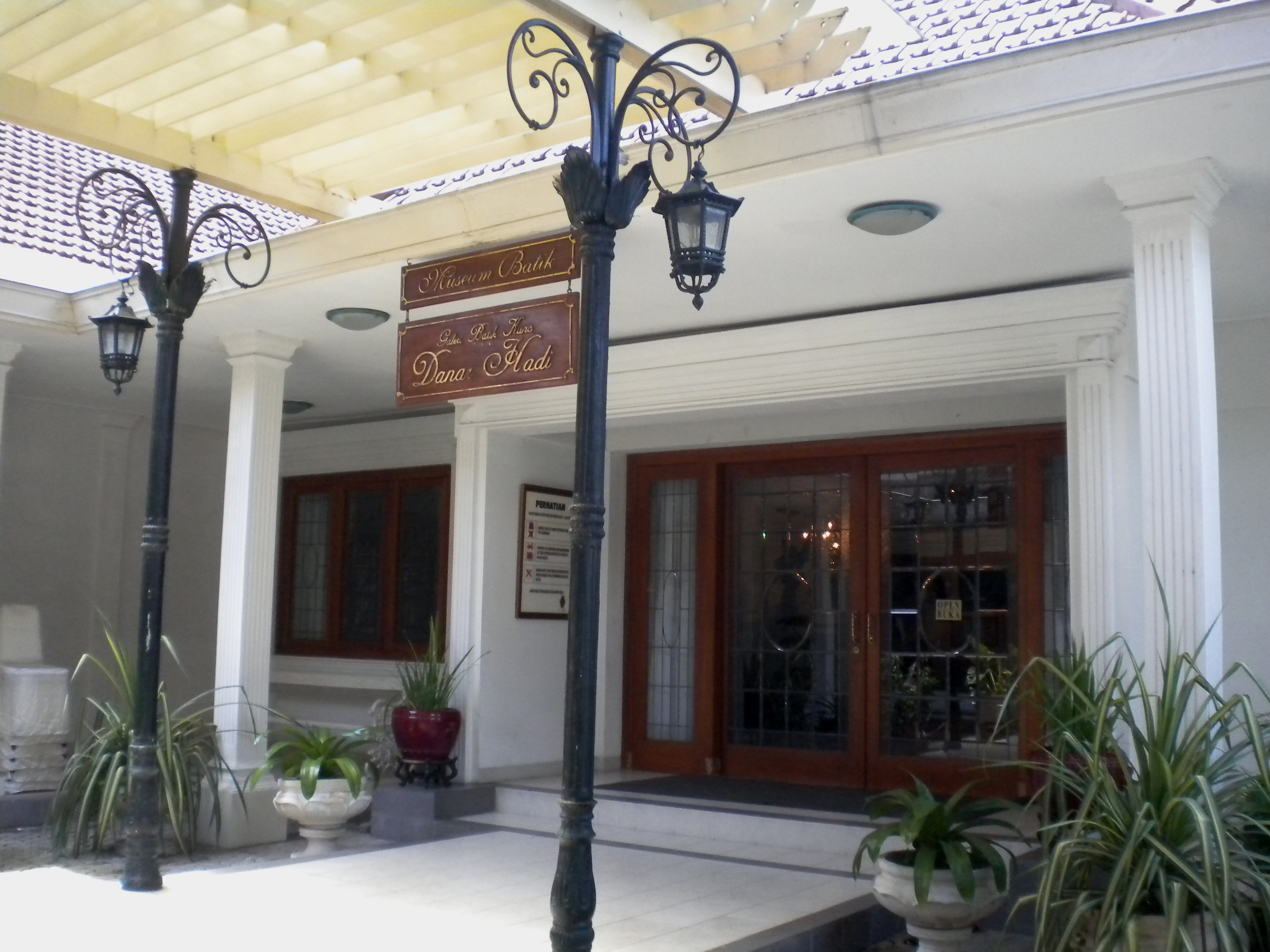
Museum Batik Danar Hadi, the owner of Batik label Danar Hadi, located in Jl. Slamet Riyadi, Solo City

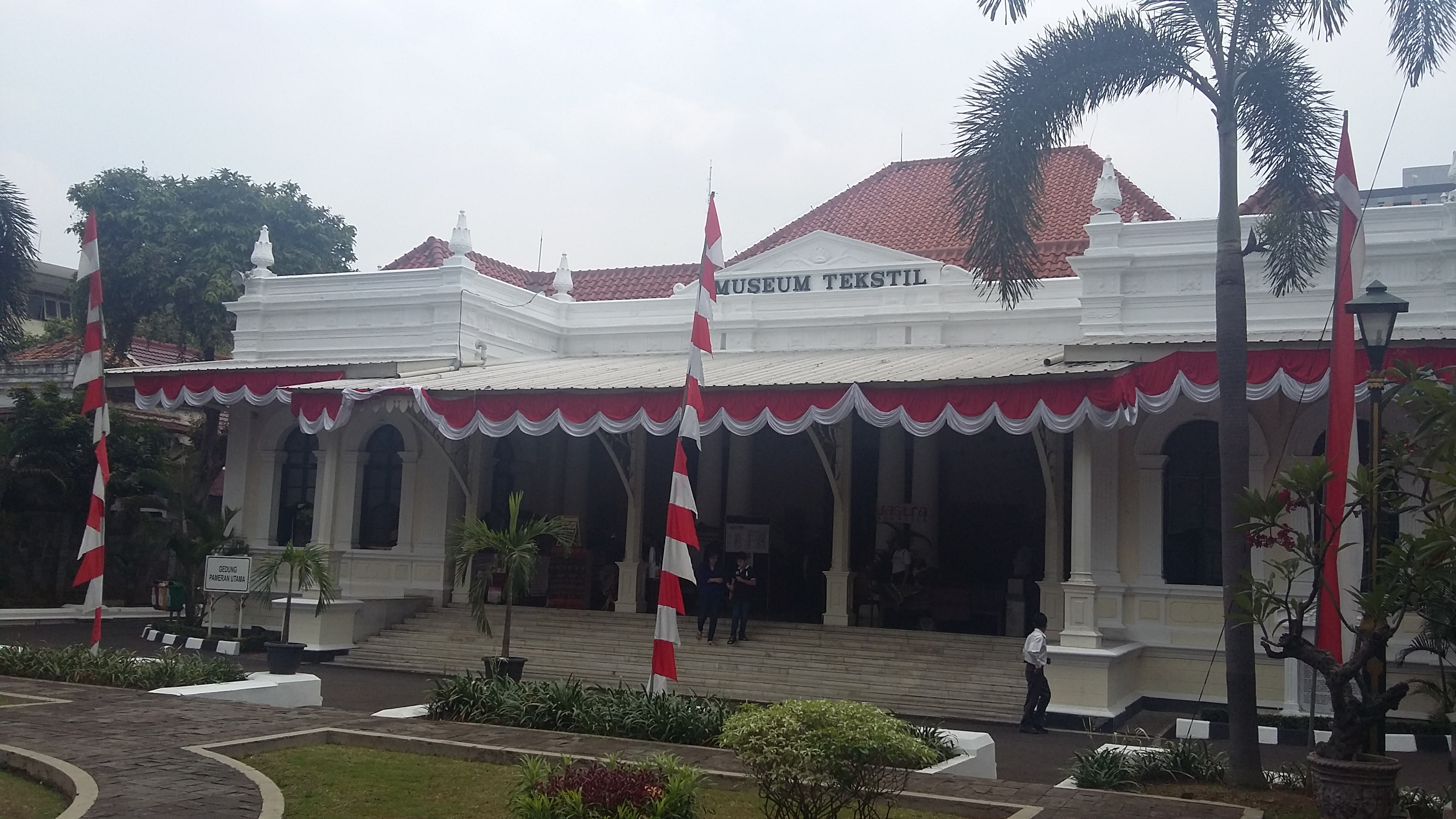
The Textile Museum in Jakarta

Java has several museums with collections of old batiks and equipment for batik production, including:

Museum Batik Keraton Yogyakarta is inside the Palace of Yogyakarta Sultanate, Yogyakarta. The museum which was inaugurated by Sultan Hamengku Buwono X on 31 October 2005 has thousands of batik collections. The batik collection here includes kawung, semen, gringsing, nitik, cuwiri, parang, barong, grompol, and other motifs. These items come from different eras, from the era of Sultan Hamengkubuwono VIII to Hamengkubuwono X. Visitors can see equipment for making batik, raw materials for dyes, irons, sculptures, paintings, and batik masks. The museum does not allow cameras.

Museum Batik Yogyakarta is in Bausasran, Yogyakarta. It was inaugurated in 1977. In 2000, it received an award from MURI for the work 'The Biggest Embroidery', a batik measuring 90 x 400 cm2. The museum holds more than 1,200 batik items consisting of 500 pieces of written batik, 560 stamped batik, 124 canting (batik tools), and 35 pans and colouring materials, including wax. Its collection consists of fabrics from the 18th to early 19th centuries in the form of long cloths and sarongs. Other collections include batik by Van Zuylen and Oey Soe Tjoen. The museum provides batik training for visitors who want to learn to make batik.

Museum Batik Pekalongan is in Pekalongan, Central Java. This museum has 1,149 batik items, including batik cloth, centuries old batik wayang beber, and traditional weaving tools. It maintains a large collection of old to modern batik, with those from coastal areas, inland areas, other areas of Java, and regions such as Sumatra, Kalimantan, Papua, and batik-type fabrics from abroad. The museum provides batik training.

Museum Batik Danar Hadi is on Jalan Slamet Riyadi, Solo City (Surakarta), Central Java. The museum, which was founded in 1967, holds items from regions such as the original Javanese Batik Keraton, Javanese Hokokai batik, coastal batik (Kudus, Lasem, and Pekalongan), and Sumatran batik. It has a collection of batik cloths reaching 1000 pieces. Visitors can see the process of making batik and can take part in batik making workshops.

The Textile Museum is on Jalan KS Tubun No. 4, Petamburan, West Jakarta. On June 28, 1976, this building was inaugurated as a textile museum by Mrs. Tien Soeharto (First Lady at that time) witnessed by Mr. Ali Sadikin as the governor of DKI Jakarta. The initial collections at the Textile Museum were obtained from donations from Wastraprema (about 500 items), then increased through purchases by the Museum and History Service, as well as donations. By 2021, the collection was recorded at 1,914 items. The batik gallery showcases ancient batik and contemporary batik developments. The batik gallery is the embryo of the National Batik Museum managed by the Indonesian Batik Foundation and the Jakarta Textile Museum.

== Cultural recognition ==
=== UNESCO designations ===
In October 2009, UNESCO designated Indonesian batik as a Masterpiece of Oral and Intangible Heritage of Humanity. As part of the acknowledgment, UNESCO insisted that Indonesia preserve its heritage. The day, 2 October 2009 has been stated by Indonesian government as National Batik Day, as also at the time the map of Indonesian batik diversity by Hokky Situngkir was opened for public for the first time by the Indonesian Ministry of Research and Technology.

Study of the geometry of Indonesian batik has shown the applicability of fractal geometry in traditional designs.

=== Postage stamps ===
Indonesia has repeatedly featured Batik in its postage stamps.

Batik in postage stamps

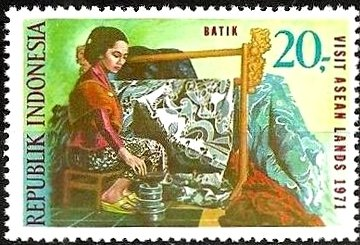
1971, 20 rupiah

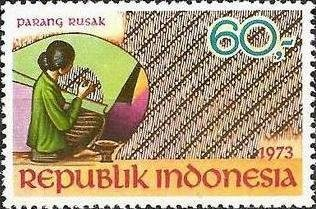
1973, 60 rupiah

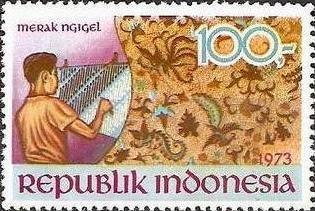
1973, 100 rupiah

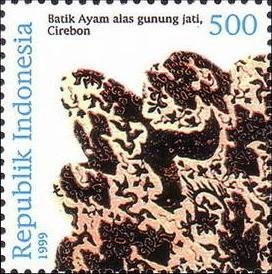
1999, 500 rupiah Cirebon

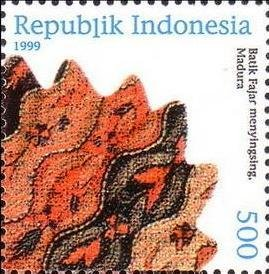
1999, 500 rupiah, Madura

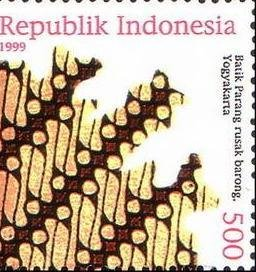
1999, 500 rupiah, Jambi

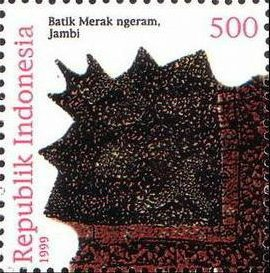
1999, 500 rupiah, Yogyakarta

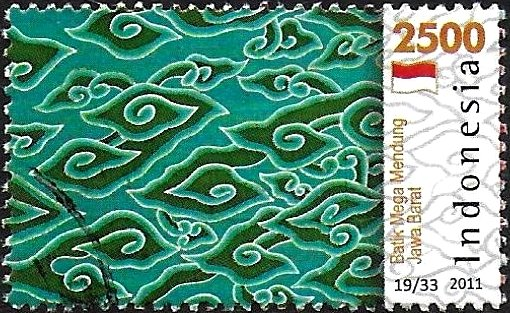
2011, 2500 rupiah

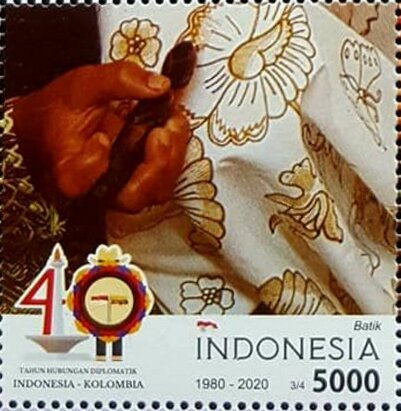
2020, 5000 rupiah

== See also ==
- Balinese textiles
- Batik industry in Sri Lanka
- Folk costume
- Ikat
- Malaysian batik
- National costume of Indonesia
- Indonesian art
- Culture of Indonesia
- Tsutsugaki, Japanese resist-dyeing using starch, not wax

== Sources ==
- Barnes, Ruth; Duggan, Geneviève; Gavin, Traude; Hamilton, Roy; Nabholz-Kartaschoff, Marie-Louise; Babcock, Tim; Niessen, Sandra (16 September 2020). "Review of Peter ten Hoopen's Ikat Textiles of the Indonesian Archipelago". SSRN Electronic Journal. doi:10.2139/ssrn.3695773.
- Harmsen, Olga (2018). Batik – How Emancipation of Dutch Housewives in the Dutch East Indies and "Back Home" Influenced Art Nouveau Design in Europe (PDF). cdf III Art Nouveau International Congress. Archived (PDF) from the original on 26 June 2022.
- Langewis, Laurens; Wagner, Frits A. (1964). Decorative Art in Indonesian Textiles. Amsterdam: CPJ van der Peet.
- Lee, Peter; Kerlogue, Fiona; Chiesa, Benjamin; Joseph, Maria Khoo (2015). Auspicious Designs: Batik for Peranakan Altars. Singapore: Asian Civilizations Museum.
- Maxwell, Robyn (2003). Textiles of Southeast Asia: Tradition, Trade and Transformation. Singapore: Periplus.
- Nava, Nadia (1991). Il batik: come tingere e decorare i tessuti diegnando con la cera. Ulisse. ISBN 88-414-1016-7.
- Pullen, Lesley (2021). Patterned Splendour: Textiles Presented on Javanese Metal and Stone Sculptures, Eighth to Fifteenth Century. Singapore: ISEAS - Yusof Ishak Institute.
- Rouffaer, G. G.; Juynboll, H. H. (1899). De batik-kunst in Nederlandsch-Indië en haar geschiedenis. Haarlem: H Kleinmann & Co.
- Sardjono, Sandra; Buckley, Christopher (2022). "A 700-years old blue-and-white batik from Indonesia". Fiber, Loom and Technique Society. 1: 64–78.
- Shaharuddin, Sharifah Imihezri Syed; Shamsuddin, Maryam Samirah; Drahman, Mohd Hafiz; Hasan, Zaimah; Asri, Nurul Anissa Mohd; Nordin, Ahmad Amri; Shaffiar, Norhashimah Mohd (2021). "A Review on the Malaysian and Indonesian Batik Production, Challenges, and Innovations in the 21st Century". SAGE Open. 11 (3). doi:10.1177/21582440211040128.
- Shen, Yuexiu; Wong, Mei Sheong (2023). "Qilin, Rabbit and Pencils: Batik Tokwi from Northcoast Java". In James Bennett; Russel Kelty (eds.). Interwoven Journeys: the Michael Abbott Collections of Asian Art. Adelaide: Art Gallery of South Australia (AGSA).
- Smend, Rudolf G.; Majlis, Brigitte Khan; Veldhuisen, Harmen C. (2013). Batik: From the Courts of Java and Sumatra. Singapore: Tuttle Publishing. Frontispiece. ISBN 978-146290695-6.
- Sumarsono, Hartono; Ishwara, Helen; Yahya, L.R. Supriyapto; Moeis, Xeni (2013). Benang Raja: Menyimpul Keelokan Batik Pesisir. Jakarta: Kepustakaan Populer Gramedia. ISBN 978-979-9106-01-8.
- Sumarsono, Hartono; Ishwara, Helen; Yahya, L.R. Supriyapto; Moeis, Xeni (2016). Batik Garutan: Koleksi Hartono Sumarsono. Jakarta: Kepustakaan Populer Gramedia. ISBN 978-602-6208-09-5.
