= Surya Institute =

Indonesian educational organization

Surya Institute or (SI) is an Indonesian-based organization specializing in educational development and training. Surya Institute was founded in 2006 by physicist Yohanes Surya. Surya Institute has a division dedicated to promoting science and mathematics called the Surya Institute for the Promotion of Science (SIPS). In 2014, Surya Institute manage three institutions: Surya College of Education Surya (STKIP Surya), Surya University and Surya Center for Learning Excellence (SCLE).

== Activities and International Event ==
Surya Institute often works with governments, local organizations, private companies and the international community to undertake research and development of teaching materials and teaching methods. It also routinely conducts teacher training events, seminars, road shows, TV shows, talk shows, science camps, math camps, competitions, olympiads, etc.

In reaching their goal, they often partners with other organizations to run international educational events, such as:

1. International Conference of Young Scientists or ICYS
2. ASEAN Science Enterprise Challenge or ASEC in 2008, Jakarta
3. Asian Science Camp, in 2008 Bali and 2018 Manado
4. World Physics Olympiad or WoPhO in 2011, Mataram, Lombok and in 2012 Karawaci, Tangerang
5. Asia-Pacific Conference of Young Scientists or APCYS in 2012, Palangkaraya
6. Asian Physics Olympiad or APHO in 2013, Bogor
7. Asian Science & Mathematics Olympiad for Primary and Secondary Schools or ASMOPSS in 2011 - present
8. International Kangaroo Math Contest or IKMC in 2010 - 2019
9. International Kangaroo Science Contest or IKSC in 2018 - 2023
10. Factorial Math Competition or FMC in 2020 - present and Factorial Math Competition International or FMC International in 2024 - present
11. Photon Science Competition or PhSC in 2024 - present and Photon Science Competition International or PhSC International in 2025 - present

In 2009, the foundation worked in Papua. They are looking for children of Papua, bringing them to the SURE Center, Summarecon Serpong, Tangerang, Banten, Indonesia and teach them physics & mathematics with GASING methods.

== Pranala Luar ==
- (in Indonesian) Surya Institute official website
- (in Indonesian) Articles in yohanessurya.com
- (in Indonesian) ASMOPSS official website
