= International Conference of Young Scientists =

International Conference of Young Scientist or ICYS is the unofficial world championship of research papers in several scientific disciplines for secondary school students. It has gained notable participation across three continents (Europe, Asia, and America). It is organised by a host institution and vary for each year. ICYS is a member of World Federation of Physics Competitions.

== History ==
It celebrated its 20th year in Bali, Indonesia. Later, a young scientist (Amin Ehsanian) suggested the new formation of the conference for 2014. The 2014 edition were supposed to be held in Ukraine but due to the Ukraine crisis, it were transferred to Serbia.

== Conference ==
- 1994 Visegrád, Hungary
- 1995 Baranovichi, Belarus
- 1996 Visegrád, Hungary
- 1997 Baranovichi, Belarus
- 1998 Visegrád, Hungary
- 1999 Baranovichi, Belarus
- 2000 Nijmegen, Netherlands - first time the conference were held outside of Hungary and Belarus, hosted by Radboud University Nijmegen
- 2001 Katowice, Poland - hosted by Youth Palace Katowice
- 2002 Kutaisi, Georgia
- 2003 Prague and Kladno, Czech Republic
- 2004 Nijmegen, Netherlands - hosted by Radboud University Nijmegen
- 2005 Katowice, Poland - hosted by Youth Palace Katowice
- 2006 Stuttgart, Germany - sponsored by Bosch, hosted by Heidehof Foundation
- 2007 Saint-Petersburg, Russia - hosted by Saint Petersburg State University
- 2008 Chernivtsi, Ukraine - hosted by Chernivtsi University and Youth Scientific Society Quasar
- 2009 Pszczyna, Poland - hosted by Boleslaw Chrobry I Comprehensive Secondary School
- 2010 Bali, Indonesia - first time the conference is hosted outside Europe, hosted by Surya Institute
- 2011 Moscow, Russia - the first country to have two different cities as host, hosted by Moscow State University, Dynasty Foundation and Metallinvestbank
- 2012 Nijmegen, Netherlands - hosted by Radboud University Nijmegen
- 2013 Bali, Indonesia - 20th edition, hosted by Surya Institute and Surya University
- 2014 Belgrade, Serbia - hosted by Regional Centre for Talents Belgrade Two
- 2015 İzmir, Turkey - hosted by İzmir University
- 2016 Cluj-Napoca, Romania - hosted by Babeş-Bolyai University
- 2017 Stuttgart, Germany - hosted by Student Research Centers Baden-Württemberg
- 2018 Belgrade, Serbia - hosted by Regional Centre for Talents Belgrade Two
- 2019 Kuala Lumpur, Malaysia - hosted by Malaysia Young Scientists Organisation
- 2022 Belgrade, Serbia - hosted by Regional Center for Talented Youth Belgrade
- 2023 Belgrade, Serbia - hosted by kashi Regional Centre for Young Talents
- 2024 İzmir, Turkey - hosted by Buca Municipality
- 2025 Thailand - hosted by KVIS
- 2026 New Delhi, India, Hosted By -St Marks Sr Sec Public School Bagh, Meera Bagh

== Participating countries ==
- Blue indicates Participate.
- Orange indicates Observer.
- Grey indicates Not participate.
- White indicates No information.

No	Countries	1994	1995	1996	1997	1998	1999	2000	2001	2002	2003	2004	2005	2006	2007	2008	2009	2010	2011	2012	2013	2014	2015	2016	2017	2018	2019
01	Azerbaijan																										
02	Belarus																										
03	Brazil																										
04	Bulgaria																										
05	Cambodia																										
06	China																										
07	Croatia																										
08	Cyprus																										
09	Czech Republic																										
10	Denmark																										
11	Finland																										
12	France																										
13	Germany																										
14	Georgia																										
15	Ghana																										
16	Greece																										
17	Hungary																										
18	India																										
19	Indonesia																										
20	Iran																										
21	Japan																										
22	Kenya																										
23	Laos																										
24	Lithuania																										
25	Malaysia																										
26	Netherlands																										
27	Nigeria																										
28	North Macedonia																										
29	Poland																										
30	Romania																										
31	Russia																										
32	Serbia																										
33	Singapore																										
34	Slovakia																										
35	South Korea																										
36	Sri Lanka																										
37	Taiwan																										
38	Thailand																										
39	Turkey																										
40	Ukraine																										
41	United Kingdom																										
42	United States																										
43	Yugoslavia																										

Only Belarus, Hungary and Ukraine have made it to all Conferences. Netherlands and Russia, each missed a Conference.

== See also ==
- Science fair
