= Situngkir =

Batak surname originating in Indonesia

Situngkir is one of Toba Batak clans originating in North Sumatra, Indonesia. People of this clan bear the clan's name as their surname. Notable people of this clan include:

- Hokky Situngkir (born 1978), Indonesian scientist
- Wilda Octaviana Situngkir (born 1995), Indonesian actress and model
