= Batik Day =

Indonesian cultural day, 2 October

National Batik Day (Hari Batik Nasional)
- Observed by: Indonesia
- Type: National
- Significance: The day Indonesian Batik is inscribed as a Masterpiece of Oral and Intangible Heritage of Humanity hy the UNESCO
- Observances: Wearing batik
- Date: 2 October
- Next time: 2 October 2026

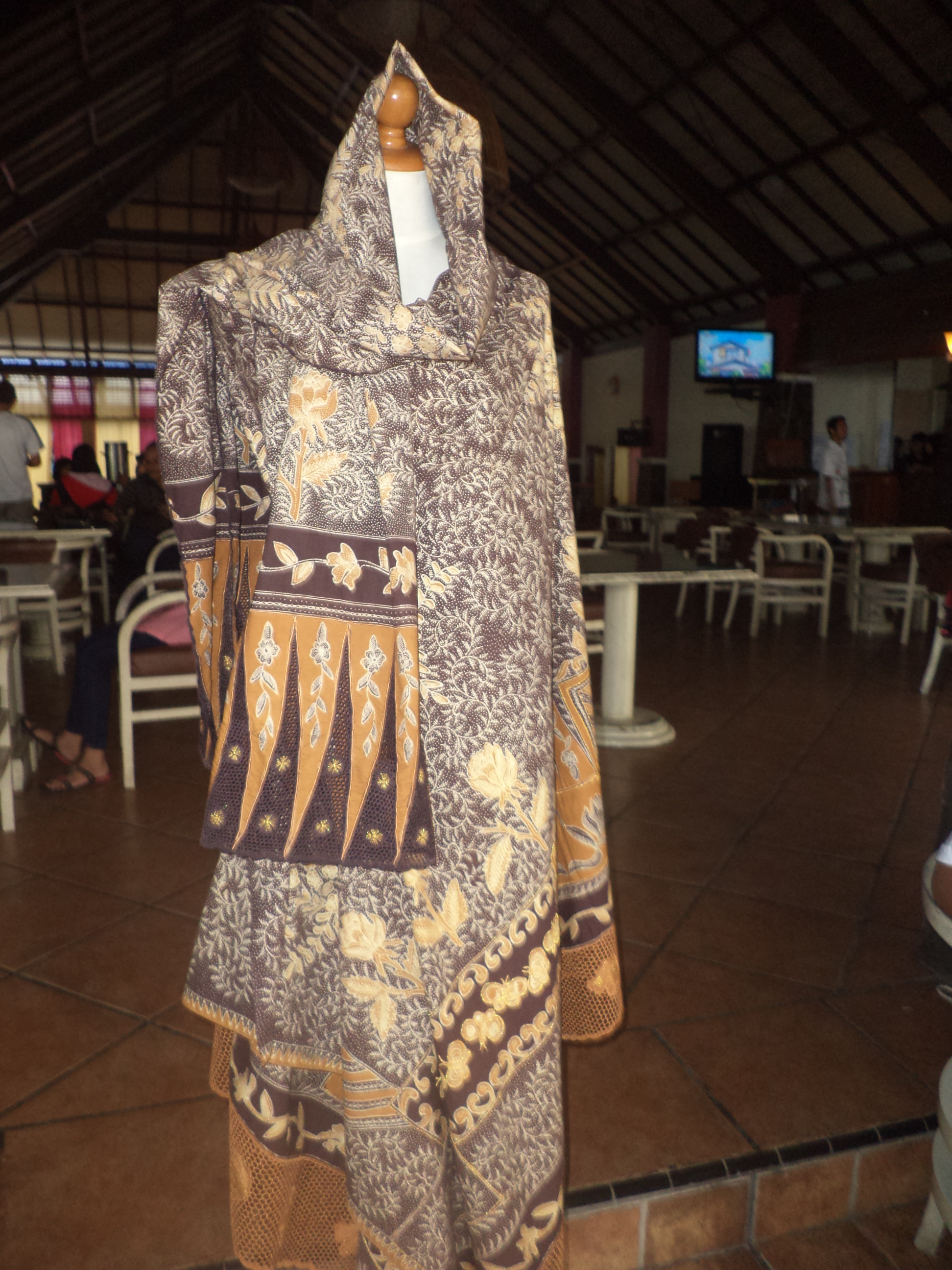
Batik Pattern

National Batik Day (Indonesian: Hari Batik Nasional) is an Indonesian cultural day for celebrating batik – the traditional cloth of Indonesia. It is celebrated on October 2 and marks the anniversary of when the UNESCO inscribed batik as a Masterpiece of Oral and Intangible Heritage of Humanity in 2009.

At the day, in Jakarta, the map of Indonesian batik diversity by Hokky Situngkir was opened for public for the first time by the Indonesian Ministry of Research and Technology. The Indonesian government strongly encourage Indonesian people (especially government officials, employees of state-owned enterprises, and students) to wear batik annually on the holiday and on Fridays to commemorate the day. Wearing batik every Friday has also been encouraged in private companies.

== Background ==
Because batik is recognized by UNESCO as an Indonesian cultural contribution to the world, Indonesians found it to be a reason to celebrate this traditional fabric and the garments made from it. It started from the meeting from the UNESCO Jakarta team on the journey of how batik came to be included on the UNESCO Representative List of the Intangible Cultural Heritage (ICH) for Humanity and the great meaning and pride it gives to many Indonesian people.

A number of batik artisans from Borobudur and Klaten, Central Java, also took part in the celebration and outlined how Batik had become an important source of livelihood development for them and their communities in the region. The group from Klaten shared inspiring stories on how they grew from 'zero to hero'. Their story takes them from being employed as workers on a low wage for a batik factory to developing their own cooperation of 169 women who have sustainably been able to increase their income by tenfold.

== Celebration ==
Batik is a traditional cloth originating from the island of Java that has roots in the country's historical artwork. In celebration of their culture, Indonesians dress head-to-toe in batik for the holiday. Batik Day is celebrated across a number of platforms all over the world. Particularly, in Indonesian organizations ranging from universities, church groups, and communities all around the world. These Indonesian organizations usually celebrate Batik Day as well in order to create awareness of Indonesia's traditional fabric to other cultures.
