= Batik industry in Sri Lanka =

Sri Lankan textile industry sector

The Batik industry in Sri Lanka is a small sector of the Sri Lankan textile industry. During the latter half of the 20th century, the Indonesian art of batik-making became firmly established in Sri Lanka. The technique was brought to Dutch Ceylon at the turn of the 19th century. It serves as a high-value export within the textile industry, and it is now a highly visible craft with galleries and factories, large and small, having sprung up in many tourist areas.

Batiks incorporate many motifs and colours, some traditional, others highly contemporary and individual.
