= Hokky Situngkir =

Indonesian scientist (born 1978)

- Born: February 7, 1978 (age 48); Pematangsiantar, North Sumatera, Indonesia
- Awards: Indonesian National Award of Intellectual Property (2013)
- Scientific career
- Fields: Complexity, Econophysics, Data Science
- Workplaces: Surya University Center for Complexity; Bandung Fe Institute

Hokky Situngkir (born February 7, 1978) is an Indonesian scientist who researches complexity theory at Surya University. He is the founder of the Bandung Fe Institute, a research institute for social complexity research. His academic activities include research regarding the aspects of fractal geometry in Indonesian Batik, mathematical aspects of Indonesian traditional folk songs and in the architecture of Borobudur, as well as Indonesian stock market analysis with econophysics alongside Indonesian senior physicist Yohanes Surya. Situngkir helped create the Indonesian Digital Library of Traditional Culture (Perpustakaan Digital Budaya Indonesia) in order to increase public access to information about the diversity of traditional Indonesian culture, for the further application of data sciences.
