= Yohanes Surya =

Indonesian physicist (born 1963)

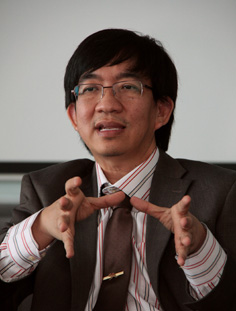
- Born: 6 November 1963 (age 62); Jakarta, Indonesia
- Education: University of Indonesia; College of William and Mary, United States
- Spouse: Christina Surya
- Awards: CEBAF/SURA Awards USA 1992/93; Zable Fellowship USA 1993/94; Creativity Awards 2005 from Creativity Development Foundation; Lencana Satya Wira Karya 2006 from President Susilo Bambang Yudhoyono and TEMPO
- Scientific career
- Fields: Physics; Nuclear physics
- Workplaces: Surya Institute, Surya Research Education Center (SURE)

Yohanes Surya (born 6 November 1963) is an Indonesian physicist and coach of Indonesian Physics Team for the Olympiad (TOFI) since 1993. Under his guidance, the Indonesian team has won 54 gold medals, 33 silver medals, and 42 bronze medals at various international science and physics competitions. He is well known for his 'fun and applicable physics' training program. He is author of 68 books and the comic Archi & Meidy.

== Biography ==
Surya is the seventh of nine children from a retired soldier father and traditional cookie seller mother. He has five sisters and three brothers. He was born in Jakarta and spent his elementary school in SD Pulogadung Petang II, East Jakarta. He continued his schooling at SMPN 90, and SMAN 12, Jakarta. His parents could not afford to send him to university, however with support from his older siblings, he was able to enroll at the Physics department at School of Mathematics and Natural Sciences, University of Indonesia. In 1986, he graduated with his bachelor's degree and continued his study in College of William and Mary in Virginia, U.S. to obtain his master and doctorate degrees with highest honors.

== Career ==
Upon completing his doctoral degree, Surya worked as a theoretical physics consultant at the TJNAF/CEBAF (Continuous Electron Beam Accelerator Facility), Virginia, USA. Despite being a USA greencard holder, Surya decided to return to Indonesia in order to develop physics as a discipline in Indonesia. As part of his work, he was made the leader of the Indonesian Physics Olympiad Team (TOFI) Training Center in 1993, which trains competitors for the Physics Olympiad. In addition, he became a lecturer and researcher of the postgraduate study in the University of Indonesia, specializing in nuclear physics.

In 2006, Surya founded Surya Institute, with the vision of transforming Indonesia through 30 thousand PhD's in science and technology, supported by the mission to reform Science and Math education in Indonesia. Simultaneously, Prof. Surya and the Surya Institute team, which now also includes the Indonesian Society for the Promotion of Science (ISPS), the Math and Science Olympiad Training Center and Surya College of Education (STKIP Surya), have also trained students from remote areas in Indonesia and simple backgrounds to win in international science competitions.

Furthermore, Surya founded Surya University in 2013, the first research-based private university in Indonesia, with its vision being "Prosperous Indonesia 2030". With hundreds of PhD as its lecturer and researcher, Surya University has hundreds of multidisciplinary research centers which involve undergraduate students in their research since freshmen year.

Now, he is active as a Special Advisor to the Coordinating Minister for Maritime Affairs and Investment (Menko Marves) in the field of technology and informatics

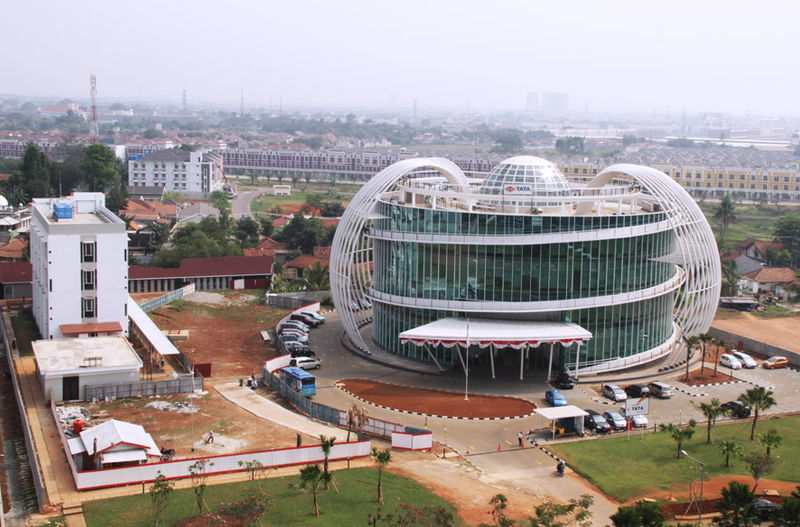
Surya Research Education Center
