= Surya University =

University in Tangerang, Indonesia

Coordinates: 6°15′37.72″S 106°37′6.47″E

- Type: Private
- Established: January 10, 2013
- Founders: Prof. Yohanes Surya, Ph.D.
- Rector: Prof. Yohanes Surya, Ph.D.
- Location: Tangerang, Indonesia
- Campus: Summarecon Serpong
- Colors: Green - Blue - Yellow
- Website: www.surya.ac.id

Surya University is an Indonesian private university that was founded in 2013 by the educational leader and physicist Prof. Yohanes Surya, Ph.D. Temporary campus was built in the area Scientia Garden, Gading Serpong, Tangerang - Banten. The university was officially established by the Minister of Education and Culture of Republic of Indonesia 07/E/O/2013 issued on January 10, 2013. The University has 3 faculties and 10 departments.

== Faculties and Study Program ==
- Faculty of Green Economy & Digital Communication

Study Program:

1. Agribusiness
2. Green Economy
3. Technopreneurship
4. Digital Communication
5. Actuarial Science
- Faculty of Clean Energy & Climate Change

Study Program:

1. Physics - Energy Engineering
2. Chemical & Green Process Engineering
3. Environmental Engineering
- Faculty of Life Science

Study Program:

1. Biotechnology & Neuroscience
2. Human Computer Interaction
3. Nutrition & Food Technology
4. Marine Science
