= Indonesian batik patterns =

Coloured cloth patterns using resist-dyeing

Indonesian batik patterns are coloured patterns on cloth made by the resist-dyeing technique of batik. The patterns are often associated with a particular city or region, and may have a symbolic meaning there.

== Kawung ==
The Batik kawung motif originated in the city of Yogyakarta and comes in a variety of styles. The motif has a geometrically organized pattern of spheres that resembles the kawung fruit (palm fruit). This pattern is thought to represent a lotus flower with four blooming crown petals, representing purity. The geometrically organized kawung pattern is seen as a representation of authority in Javanese society. Power is symbolized by the dot in the center of the geometrically aligned ovals. This reflects the position of rulers being the center of authority, which may now be understood as a depiction of the relationship between the people and the government. Other kawung symbolisms are connected to wisdom, such as representing the ancient Javanese philosophy of life of sedulur papat lima pancer. As a result, it is intended signify human existence, in the hopes that a person would not forget their roots. The colour scheme of the kawung batik pattern, which includes a combination of dark and bright hues represents human traits. As the kawung pattern is frequently regarded as a palm tree's fruit that is thought to be extremely beneficial for people, it is believed that whoever uses this motif will have a positive influence on the environment. Furthermore, the kawung batik motif is seen as a sign of power and justice. Since the Kawung motif is frequently associated with a symbolism of authority and has many philosophical meanings, it was formerly used only by the Javanese royal family.

== Parang ==
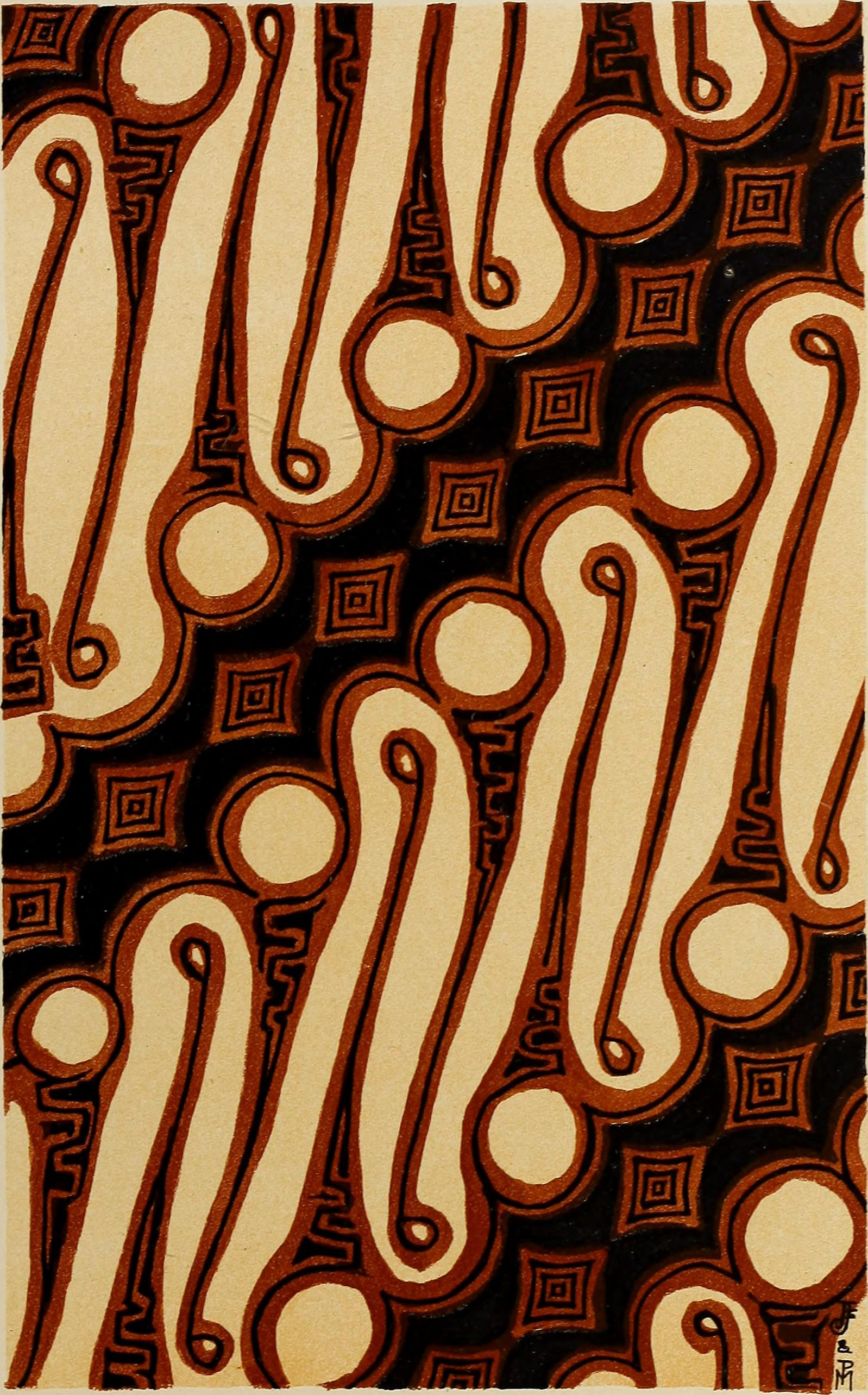
The Javanese Parang motif

The word Parang comes from the Javanese for slope. The motif depicts a diagonal line descending from high to low and has a slope of 45 degrees. The basic pattern is the letter S. The meaning of the parang motif can be interpreted in two ways. Some speculate this theme is derived from the pattern of the sword worn by knights and kings when fighting. Others say Panembahan Senapati designed the pattern while watching the South Sea waves crash against the beach's rocks, with the ocean waves symbolizing the center of natural energy, or the king. The parang motif's oblique construction is a sign of strength, greatness, authority, and speed of movement. The parang motif, like the kawung design, is a batik larang as it is exclusively worn by the monarch and his relatives. The size of the parang motif represents the wearer's position in the royal family's hierarchy. The parang pattern has many variations, each of which has its own meaning and is allocated to a certain member of the royal family based on their rank. Barong, rusak, gendreh, and klithik are some variations of the parang motif. In general, the motif is meant to represent a person's strong will and determination. It represents a strong relationship and bond, both in terms of efforts to improve oneself, efforts to fight for prosperity, as well as forms of family ties.

== Mega mendung ==
The mega mendung pattern has become a symbol of the city of its origin, Cirebon, due to its widespread popularity. The entrance of the Chinese traders is credited with the birth of the mega mendung motif. The motif is formed like a cloud, representing nirvana and the transcendental notion of divinity in Chinese culture. In another variant, the inspiration for this motif came from someone having seen a cloud reflected in a puddle of water while the weather was overcast. Mega mendung motifs must have a seven colour gradations. The motif's name means "the sky will rain", and the motif's seven colour gradations are supposed to represent the seven layers of the sky. The term mendung, which means "cloudy", is used in the pattern's name to represent patience. This means humans should not be quick to anger and should exercise patience even when confronted with emotional events. The cloud's structure should be consistent, as the direction must be horizontal rather than vertical. The clouds must be flat, as the cloud's purpose is to shield those beneath it from the scorching sun.

== Tujuh rupa ==
The Tujuh rupa ("Seven Appearances") pattern originates in Pekalongan and is the product of a fusion of Indonesian and Chinese cultures. Ceramic ornaments from China are frequently used in the Tujuh Rupa motif. However, the embellishments on these motifs sometimes include brilliantly coloured ornaments of natural elements such as animals and plants. The Tujuh Rupa motifs signifies ancestral ties and to represent gentleness and compassion. The motifs portrayed frequently represent aspects of coastal people's life, such as their ability to adapt to other cultures.

== Truntum ==
The Truntum pattern was developed by Kanjeng Ratu Kencana (Queen Sunan Paku Buwana III) in the years 1749–1799 as a symbol of true, unconditional, and eternal love. It embodies a hope that as love becomes stronger, it will become more fruitful. Truntum comes from the word nuntun (guide). According to legend, Kanjeng Ratu Kencana's spouse disregarded her because he was preoccupied with his new concubine. She was inspired to design a batik with a truntum motif shaped like a star after looking up at the clear, star-studded sky. The king subsequently discovered the Queen creating the lovely pattern, and his feelings for her grew stronger with each passing day. Furthermore, the truntum pattern represents loyalty and devotion.

== Sogan ==
As the colouring technique of this Soga motif employs natural dyes extracted from the trunk of the soga tree, the batik motif is therefore known as Sogan. Traditional Sogan batik is a kind of batik unique to the Javanese Keraton, specifically Keraton Yogyakarta and Keraton Solo. The traditional Keraton patterns are generally followed by this Sogan motifs.The colours of Sogan Yogya and Solo are what differentiates the two Sogan motif variations from each other. Yogya sogan motifs are predominantly dark brown, black, and white, whereas Solo sogan motifs are often orange-brown and brown. The Sogan motif uses five primary colours to represent the human nature: black, red, yellow, white, and green are the five colours.

== Lasem ==
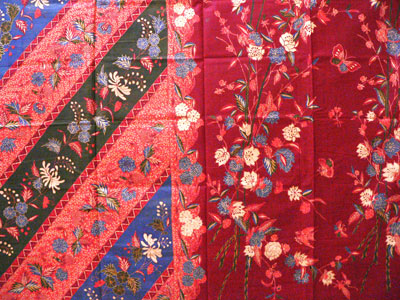
Batik Lasem Tulis

Lasem batik is a coastal batik that developed through a cross-cultural exchange between native Javanese batik that were influenced by the Keraton motif, and the incorporation of foreign cultural aspects, particularly Chinese culture. Therefore, the Lasem Batik has a distinct look and is rich in Chinese and Javanese cultural subtleties. The Lasem motif is distinguished by its distinctive red hue, known as getih pitik or 'chicken blood'. This is not to imply it is coloured with chicken blood, but in the past, the dye powder, which was generally imported from Europe, was combined with Lasem water to turn it crimson. Even if it is close to the traditional Lasem hue, the red colour is now a little different. The Lasem motif comes in many variations, but the most common is that of China's famed Hong bird. The origin of the motif started when Admiral Cheng Ho's crew member Bi Nang Un is reported to have moved to Central Java with his wife Na Li Ni, where she learnt to create batik motifs. Na Li Ni is credited as being the first to use dragon designs, hong birds, Chinese money, and the colour red in batik. As a result, the Lasem patterns and colours have symbolic connotations linked to Chinese and Javanese philosophy, resulting in the motif carrying a meaning of unity and a representation of Chinese and Javanese acculturation.

== Sidomukti ==
The Sidomukti batik motif is a Surakarta, Central Java-based motif. The Sidomulyo motif has been developed into this motif, whereby Paku Buwono IV altered the backdrop of the white Sidomulyo batik motif to the ukel motif, which was eventually dubbed the Sidomukti batik motif. This batik design is a kind of Keraton batik produced using natural soga dyes. On Sidomukti batik cloth, the colour of soga or brown is the traditional batik colour. The term Sidomukti comes from the word Sido, which means "to become" or "accepted", and "mukti", which means "noble", "happy", "powerful", "respected", and "prosperous". As a result, the Sidomukti motif represents the desire to achieve inner and external happiness, or for married couples, the hope of a bright and happy future for the bride and groom. The Sidomukti motifs are made up of multiple ornaments with different meanings and philosophies. A butterfly is the main ornament of this motif. Enlightenment, liberty, and perfection are all associated with this ornamentation. Furthermore, the butterfly represents beauty, great aspirations, and a brighter future. The Singgasana or throne ornament is the second ornament. This ornament is meant to important positions, implying that the person who wears it will ascend in rank and status. It is envisioned that the individual would be recognized and appreciated by a large number of people. The Meru ornament, often known as mountain ornaments, is the third ornament. Meru is defined as a lofty mountain top where the gods live in Javanese Hindu tradition. Because the Meru ornament represents grandeur, magnificence, and firmness, it represents a want for the wearer to be successful. The flower ornament is the last ornament, and it is intended to represent beauty. This ornament represents the hope for something wonderful in life that is sturdy and substantial to hang on to, despite the numerous challenges that may arise.

== Sidomulyo ==
The Sidomulyo batik motif dates back to the Kartasura Mataram period, when Sultan Pakubuwono IV changed the pattern's base with isen-isen ukel. The Sidomulyo pattern is a type of Keraton batik, and originates from Surakarta, Central Java. Sido means "to become" or "accepted" in Javanese, whereas mulyo means "noble”. During the wedding ceremony, a bride and groom generally wear a batik fabric with the Sidomulyo motif in the hope that the family would thrive in the future.

== Sekar Jagad ==
The Sekar Jagad motif has been popular since the 18th century. It may be intended to depict the beauty and diversity of the world's ethnic groups, or it may derive from the Javanese words sekar (flower) and jagad (world), for the beauty of flowers. The existence of curving lines like islands is a feature of the motif, making it look like a map. The motif is irregularly patterned, unlike many other batik motifs. The island-shaped lines, isen-isen, have embedded motifs such as kawung, truntum, slopes, flora and fauna.
