= Tujuh rupa (batik) =

Indonesian batik motifs

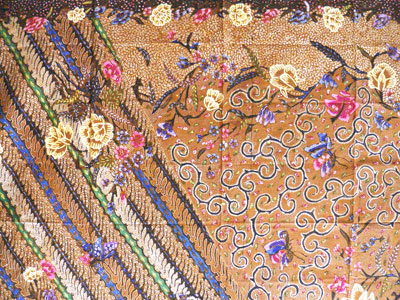
- Tujuh rupa batik motif
- Type: Art fabric
- Material: Cambrics, silk, cotton
- Place of origin: Indonesia

Indonesian Batik
- UNESCO Intangible Cultural Heritage
- Country: Indonesia
- Reference: 00170
- Region: Asia and the Pacific

Inscription history
- Inscription: 2009 (4th session)
- List: Representative

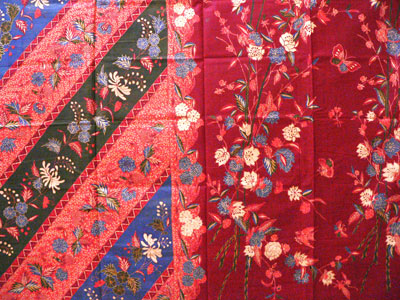
One of the tujuh rupa batik motifs

Tujuh rupa batik (Indonesian: Batik tujuh rupa) is one of the Indonesian batik motifs originating from Pekalongan, Central Java. This tujuh rupa batik motif is very thick with natural nuances. In general, tujuh rupa batik displays animal or plant motifs. The motifs are taken from various mixtures of local culture and Chinese ethnicity. Because, in the past, Pekalongan was a transit point for traders from various countries. Thus, it is this cultural acculturation that makes Pekalongan batik unique to nature, especially the jlamprang motif, the bouquetan motif, the moonlight motif, the cement motif, the pisan bali motif and the lung-lungan motif.

== Overview ==
Batik tujuh rupa is known to be very rich in color, describing the characteristics of coastal community life which are easy to adapt to outside cultural influences, and are also able to adapt to the influence of inland batik. Tujuh rupa batik craftsmen have placed Chinese ceramic ornaments as a manifestation of ancestral cultural ties which in their paintings have eloquence and tenderness. Various ornamental plants are the main objects, and are widely found in Chinese ceramic paintings, combined with various animals such as sparrows, peacocks, dragons, and butterflies. Batik patterns for worship purposes adapt the various forms of human gods in the sky kingdom according to ancestral religious beliefs called Tok-Wi, the type of batik used for Chinese prayer altars.

The influence of Cirebon batik on the development of Pekalongan batik can be seen in the awards given by the Cirebon palace to Pekalongan batik, especially by the Chinese aristocrats. The Cirebon palace's appreciation for Pekalongan batik was not only due to the decoration of Ming dynasty ceramics, but also due to the characteristic of Pekalongan batik, namely the way of making batik which was different from the way batik was made in other areas.

== Philosophy ==
Batik tujuh rupa which have the meaning of eloquence and softness. This motif also describes the lives of Javanese coastal people who are easy to adapt to foreign cultures. This cultural acculturation of the seven-way batik motif is what makes this batik unique, interesting and a distinctive feature of Pekalongan. Various batik motifs created in various regions become a symbol of the diversity and wisdom of Indonesian culture. Batik is not only beautiful to look at, but has a deep meaning in every motif.

== See also ==
- Batik
  - Batik parang
  - Batik kawung
  - Batik megamendung
- Art of Indonesia
