= Parang (batik) =

Indonesian batik motifs

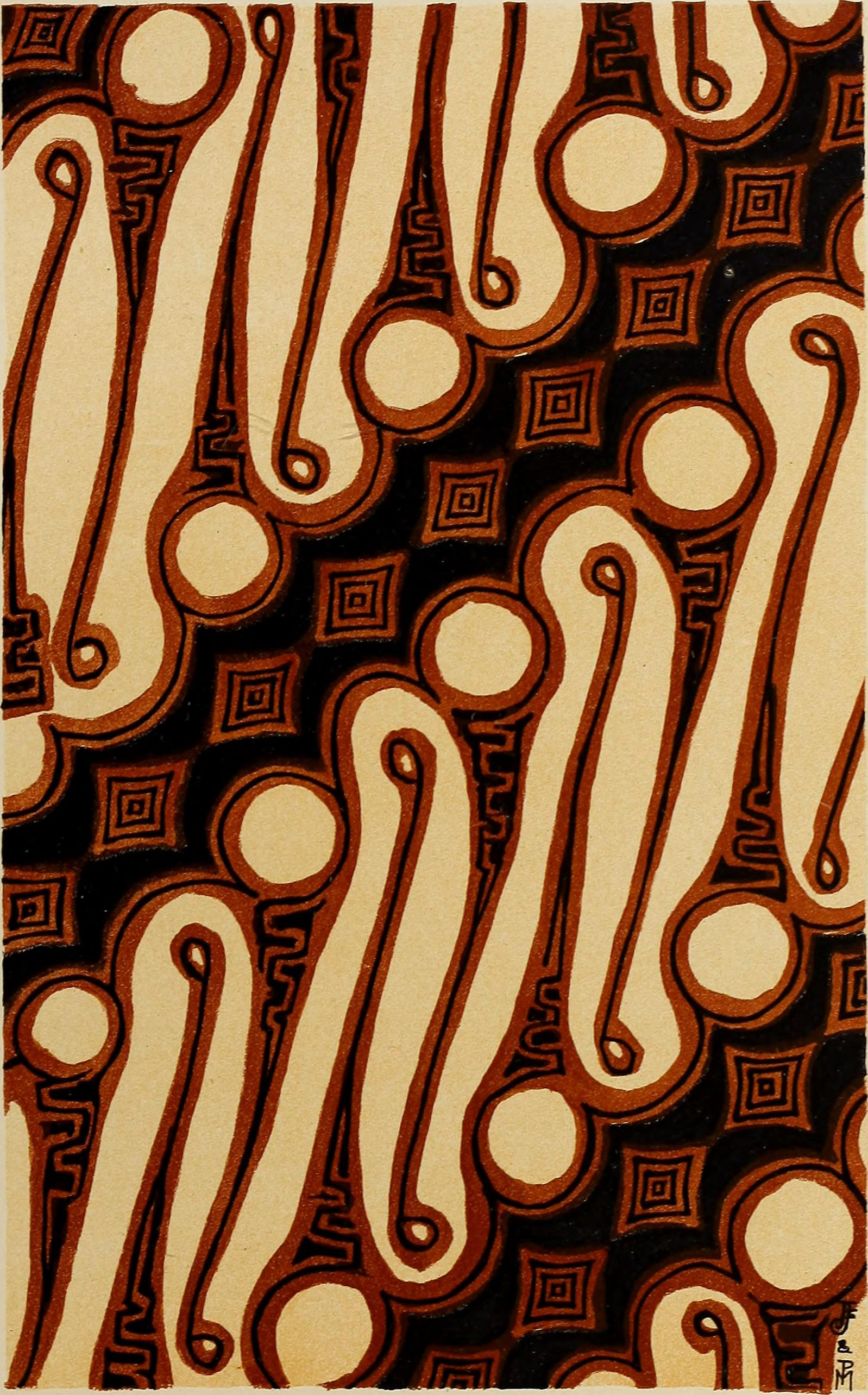
- Parang batik motif
- Type: Art fabric
- Material: Cambrics, silk, cotton
- Place of origin: Indonesia

Indonesian Batik
- UNESCO Intangible Cultural Heritage
- Country: Indonesia
- Reference: 00170
- Region: Asia and the Pacific

Inscription history
- Inscription: 2009 (4th session)
- List: Representative
- Written batik (batik tulis) and stamped batik (batik cap)

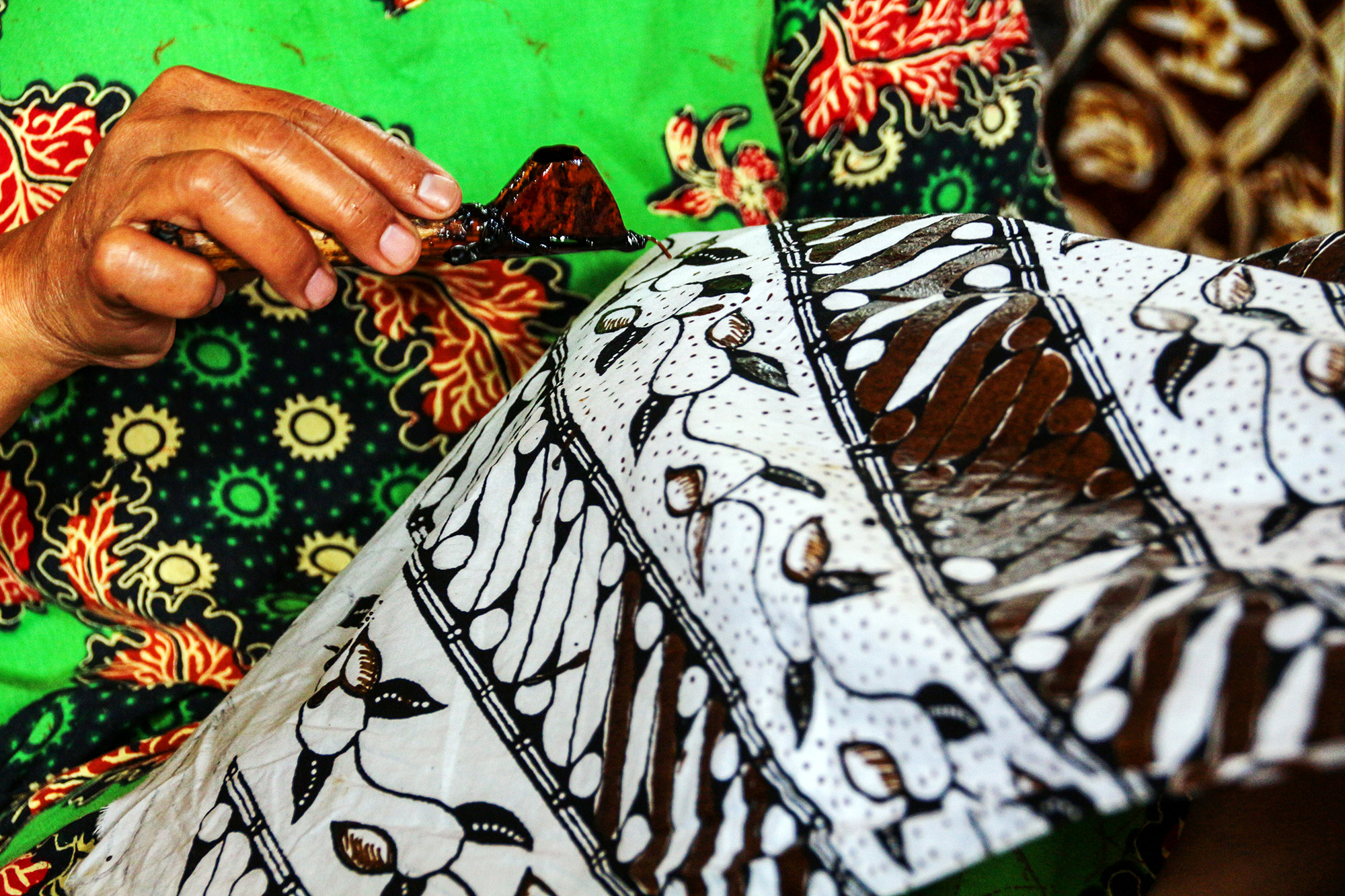
Batik craftswomen in Java drawing intricate patterns using canting and wax that are kept hot and liquid in a small heated pan, on 27 July 2011

Parang batik (Javanese: ꧋ꦧꦠꦶꦏ꧀ꦥꦫꦁ, Indonesian: Batik Parang) is one of the oldest Indonesian batik motifs. Parang comes from the Javanese word Pereng which means slope. Parang depicts a diagonal line descending from high to low. The arrangement of the S motifs intertwining unbroken symbolizes continuity. The basic shape of the letter S is taken from the ocean waves which depict a spirit that never goes out.

Parang batik is an original Indonesian batik motif that has existed since the time of the Kartasura (Solo), Mataram palace (Present day Central Java). The Parang batik motif is credited to be created by Sultan Agung of Mataram during his visit to the southern coast of Java (Indonesian: Pantai selatan). The Sultan got his inspiration from the waves rolling in the Parangtritis sea.

== The Meaning and Philosophy of Parang Batik ==
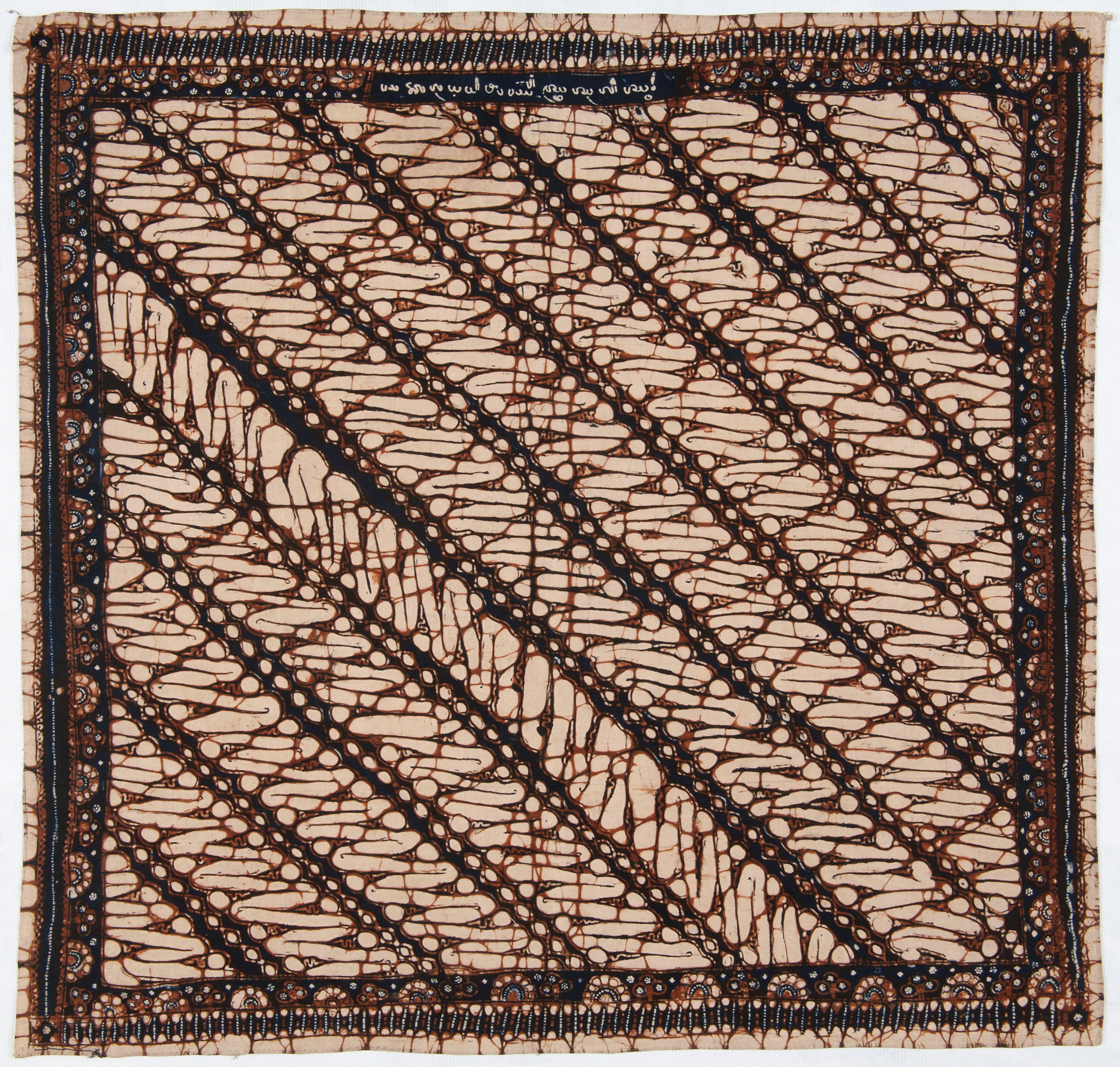
Parang batik made in the 19th century.

Parang batik has a high meaning and has a high philosophical value, this batik motif is one of the oldest basic batik motifs in Indonesia. Parang has the meaning of advice to never give up, like ocean waves that never stop moving. Batik Parang also depicts a relationship that never breaks, both in terms of efforts to improve oneself, efforts to fight for prosperity, as well as forms of family ties.

- As a symbol of sustainability, the Parang batik motif depicts continuity from top to bottom. This symbol describes the continuation of a struggle from parents to their children or from parents to younger ones. In ancient times this batik motif became a reinforcement between parents and their children as in the king who gave gifts to his children. By giving gifts to his children, it is hoped that a child can continue what his parents aspired to.
- The parang batik motif also means don't give up easily. The motifs are like waves in the ocean that never break, never get tired and keep on moving. This illustrates a message that in living human life, it is not easy to give up like waves that continue to hit the reef without getting tired. We must be consistent, never give up in fighting for our ideals and always be consistent in improving ourselves. So the hope is that by using this motif people can have a stand and the spirit not to give up.
- The parang batik motif can also be interpreted as war. The real war is a war against our passions, not a war against our fellow human beings. So by wearing a parang batik motif, the wearer is expected to be able to fight his passions, whether they come from himself or come from outside influences.
- Have agility, noble ideals and loyalty. This meaning is reflected in the dynamics in the parang motif which describes agility, another meaning in the diagonal line in the parang batik motif which contains the philosophy to continue to have noble ideals. Another meaning is also found in the vertical line between the letter S which describes loyalty and continuity in life.

Parang berarti perang, para raja jawa dan kesatria jawa selalu memakai batik parang yang berarti perang melawan hawa nafsu nya setiap hari, terus menerus. Hanya para raja ksatria lah yang boleh pakai batik parang. itu sebagai agama nya, sebagai maujud ageman nya setiap hari, ucap tekat laku lampah.

Parang means war, Javanese kings and knights always wear parang batik which means war against their passions every day. Only kings and knights are allowed to wear parang batik. Parang batik is like religion, to achieve the perfection of a better life.

— Syafril Indra Kusuma

== Type of batik parang ==
- Parang Rusak. This motif is a batik motif created by Penembahan Senapati while meditating on the south coast (Pantai selatan). This batik motif is inspired by the waves that never tire of hitting the beach reefs. This motif symbolizes human beings who internally fight evil by controlling their desires so that their wise, noble character will prevail.
- Parang Barong. This motif is a motif that has a larger size than a broken machete, which was created by Sultan Agung of Mataram. This motif has the meaning of self-control in the dynamics of continuous effort, wisdom in movement, and prudence in acting.
- Parang Klitik. This motif is a machete pattern with a subtle style. The size is also smaller and also depicts a feminine image. This motif symbolizes gentleness, subtle and wise behavior. Usually used by the princess of the king.
- Parang Slobog. This motif symbolizes determination, thoroughness and patience, and is usually used in inauguration ceremonies. This motif has the meaning of hope that the inaugurated leader can carry out and carry out his duties with trust accompanied by inner wisdom.

== See also ==
- Batik
  - Kawung (batik)
  - Megamendung (batik)
  - Tujuh rupa (batik)
- Art of Indonesia
