= Batik =

Cloth dyeing technique

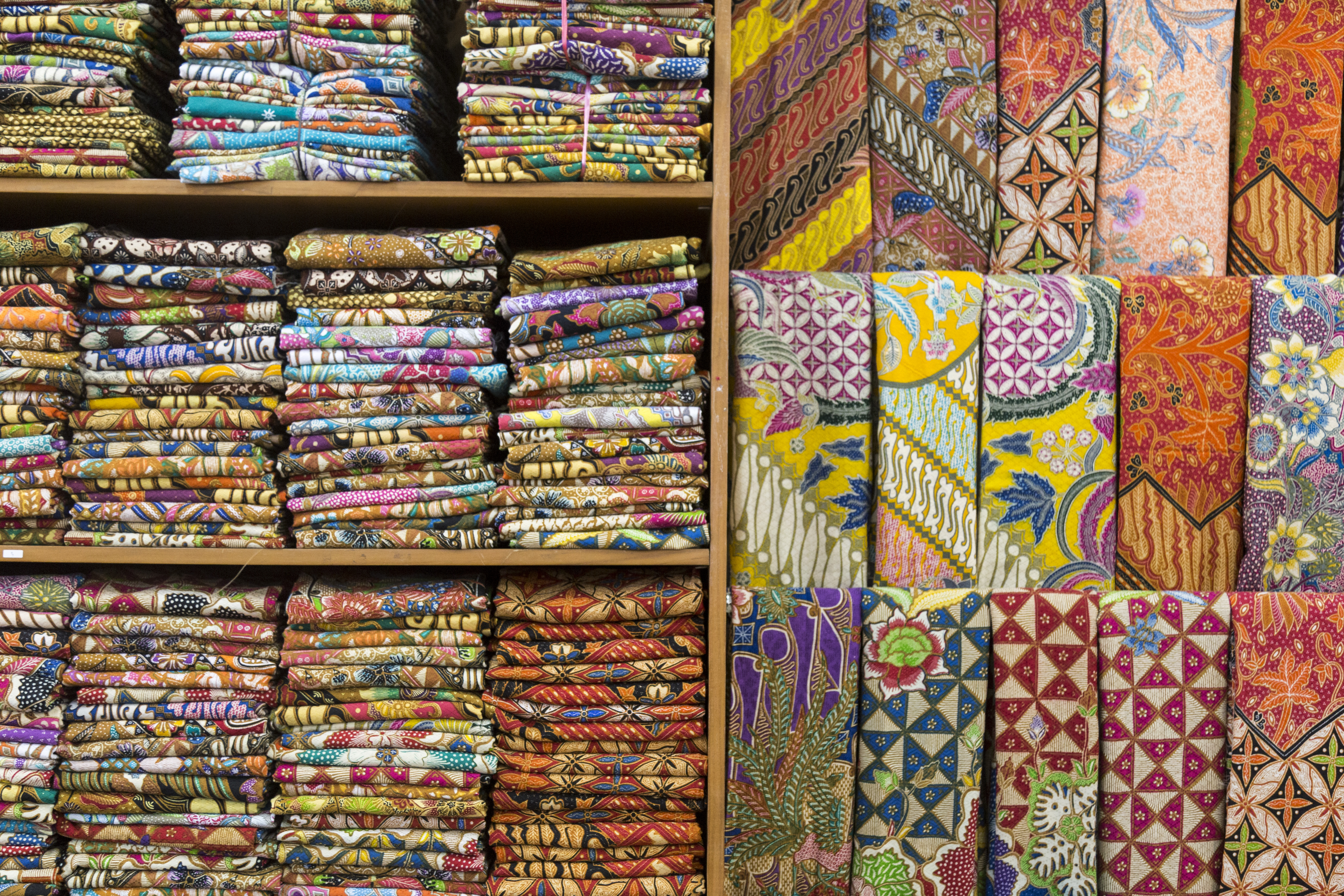
- Cirebon-style batik at the Trusmi Batik Village, West Java
- Type: Art fabric
- Material: Cambrics; silk; cotton

Batik is a dyeing technique using wax resist. The term is also used to describe patterned textiles created with that technique. Batik is made by drawing or stamping wax on a cloth to prevent colour absorption during the dyeing process. This creates a patterned negative when the wax is removed from the dyed cloth. Artisans may create intricate coloured patterns with multiple cycles of wax application and dyeing. Patterns and motifs vary widely even within countries. Some patterns hold symbolic significance and are used only in certain occasions, while others were created to satisfy market demand and fashion trends.

Resist dyeing using wax has been practised since ancient times, and it is attested in several world cultures, such as Egypt, southern China (especially among hilltribes like the Miao, Bouyei, and Gejia peoples), India, Indonesia, Malaysia, Nigeria, and Sri Lanka. The technique developed in Indonesia (especially in Java) is among the most sophisticated, although its antiquity is difficult to determine. It first became widely known outside of Southeast Asia when it was described in the 1817 History of Java, leading to significant collecting efforts and scholarly studies of the tradition and crafts. Javanese batik was subject to several innovations in the 19th to early-20th centuries, such as the use of stamp printing of wax to increase productivity. Many workshops and artisans are active today, creating a wide range of products and influencing other textile traditions and artists.

== Etymology ==
The English word batik is borrowed from Javanese bathik (Javanese script: ꦧꦛꦶꦏ꧀, Pegon: باطيء). (Note: Javanese pronunciation: [ˈb̥aʈɪʔ]; Indonesian: [ˈbatɪk]) English dictionaries tend to define batik as a general dyeing technique, meaning that cloths with similar methods of production but culturally unrelated to Javanese batik may be labelled as batik in English. (Note: It is also Javanese terms that are often used in English sources to discuss batik cloths and techniques) Robert Blust traces the Javanese word as a reflex of Proto-Austronesian *batik and its doublet *beCik which means decorations and patterns in general. (Note: Some sources claim that the term is a contraction of two Javanese words amba 'to write' and titik 'dots' or some other variations, but invariably these claims do not have clear source and is more akin to folk derived backronym.) In Java, the word is only attested in sources post dating the Hindu–Buddhist period, from the 16th century onward. (Note: Only the term tulis warna, surmised to be similar to the modern batik tulis production technique, has been attested in pre-Islamic Javanese sources) Outside of Java, the word first appears in a 1641 merchant ship's bill of lading as batick. The term and technique came to wider public notice beyond Southeast Asia following Thomas Stamford Raffles's description of batik process in his 1817 book The History of Java. Colonial era Dutch sources record the word in various spellings, such as mbatik, mbatek, batik, and batek.

== History ==
=== Ancient to early modern periods ===
Ancient pieces and representation of Resist dyeing using wax

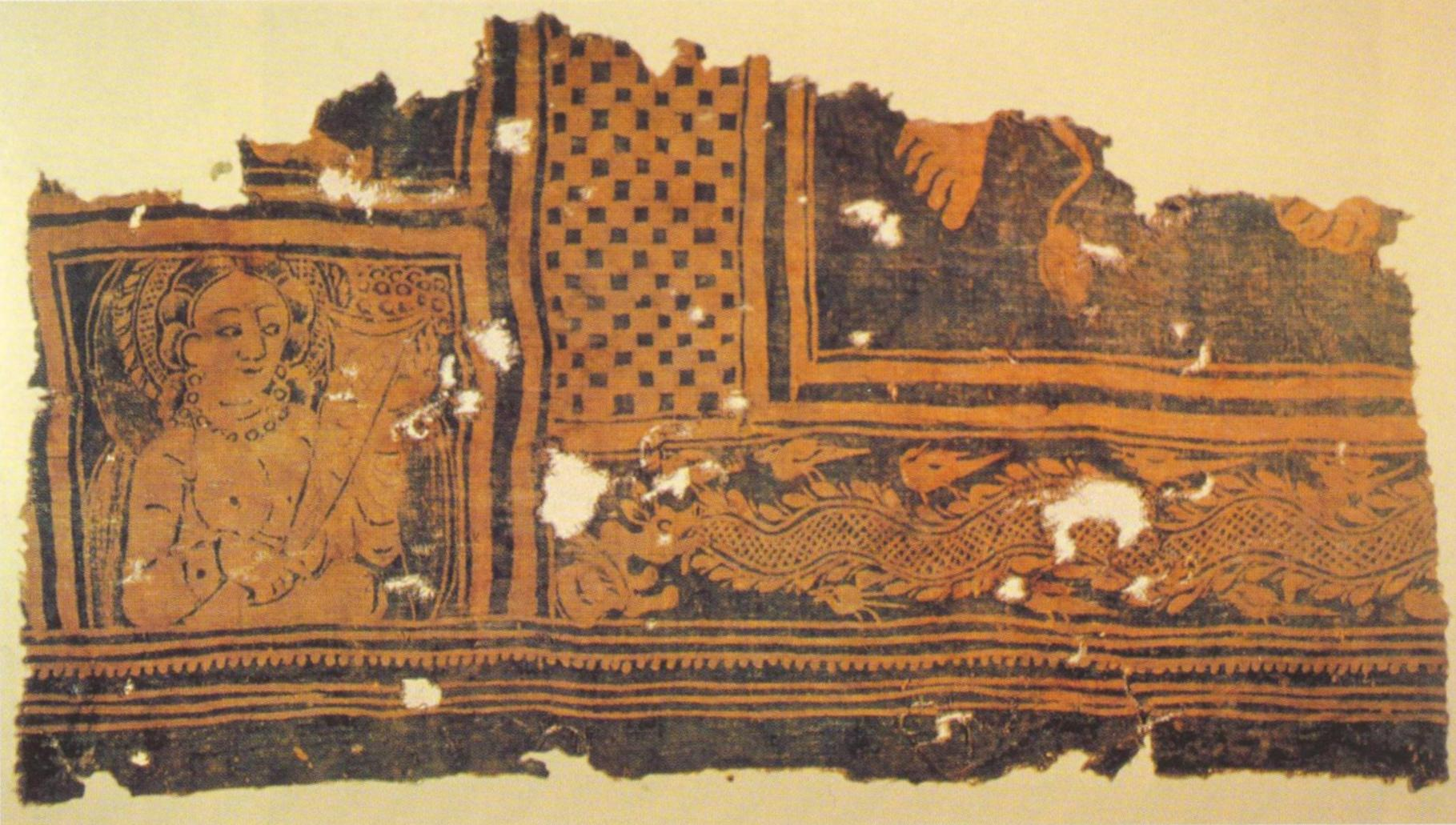
Fragment of dyed textile from Niya (Tarim Basin), China, 3rd to early 4th century

Fragment of hanging with Biblical scenes, from Byzantine period Egypt, early 6th century

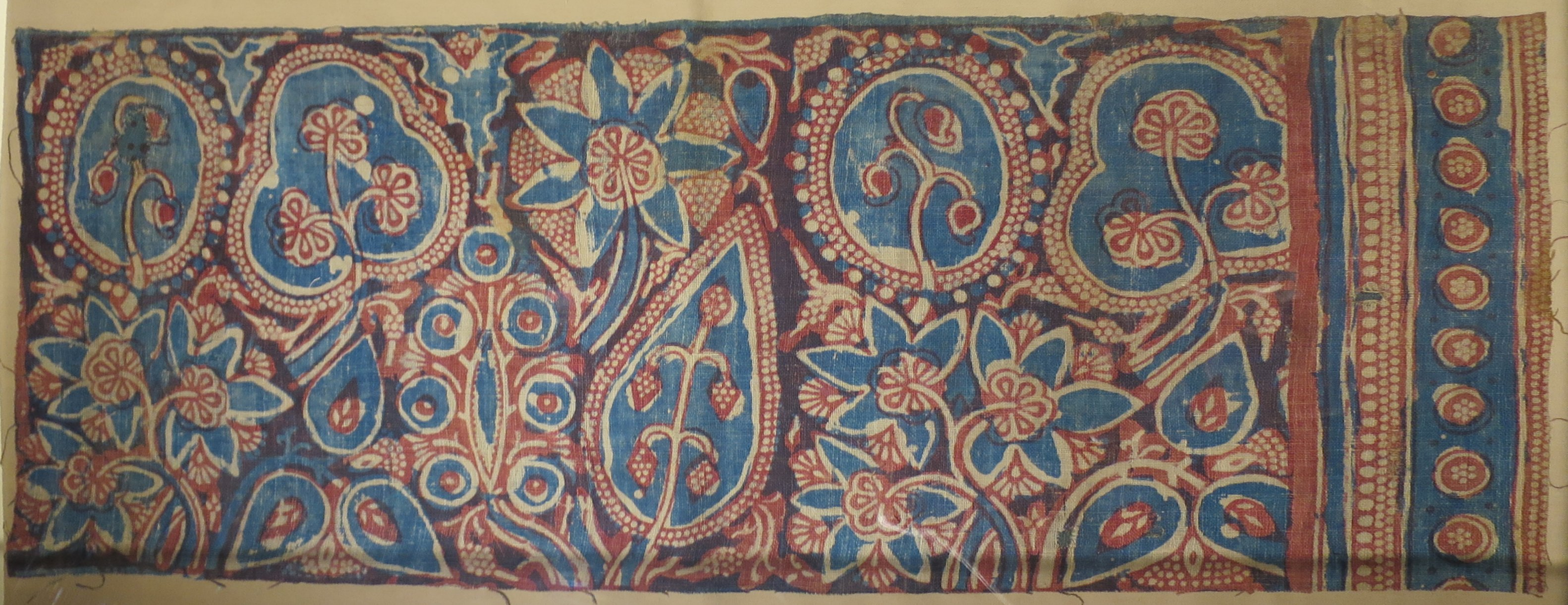
Ceremonial banner from India, possibly 14th century

Batik-like resist dyeing is an ancient art form. It existed in Egypt in the 4th century BC, where it was used to wrap mummies; linen was soaked in wax, and scratched using a stylus. It continued to be used into the medieval Byzantine era, although surviving pieces are rare. In Asia, the technique is attested in India, the Tang dynasty in China, and the Nara Period in Japan. In Africa, it was practiced by the Yoruba people of Nigeria, as well as by the Soninke and Wolof of Senegal.

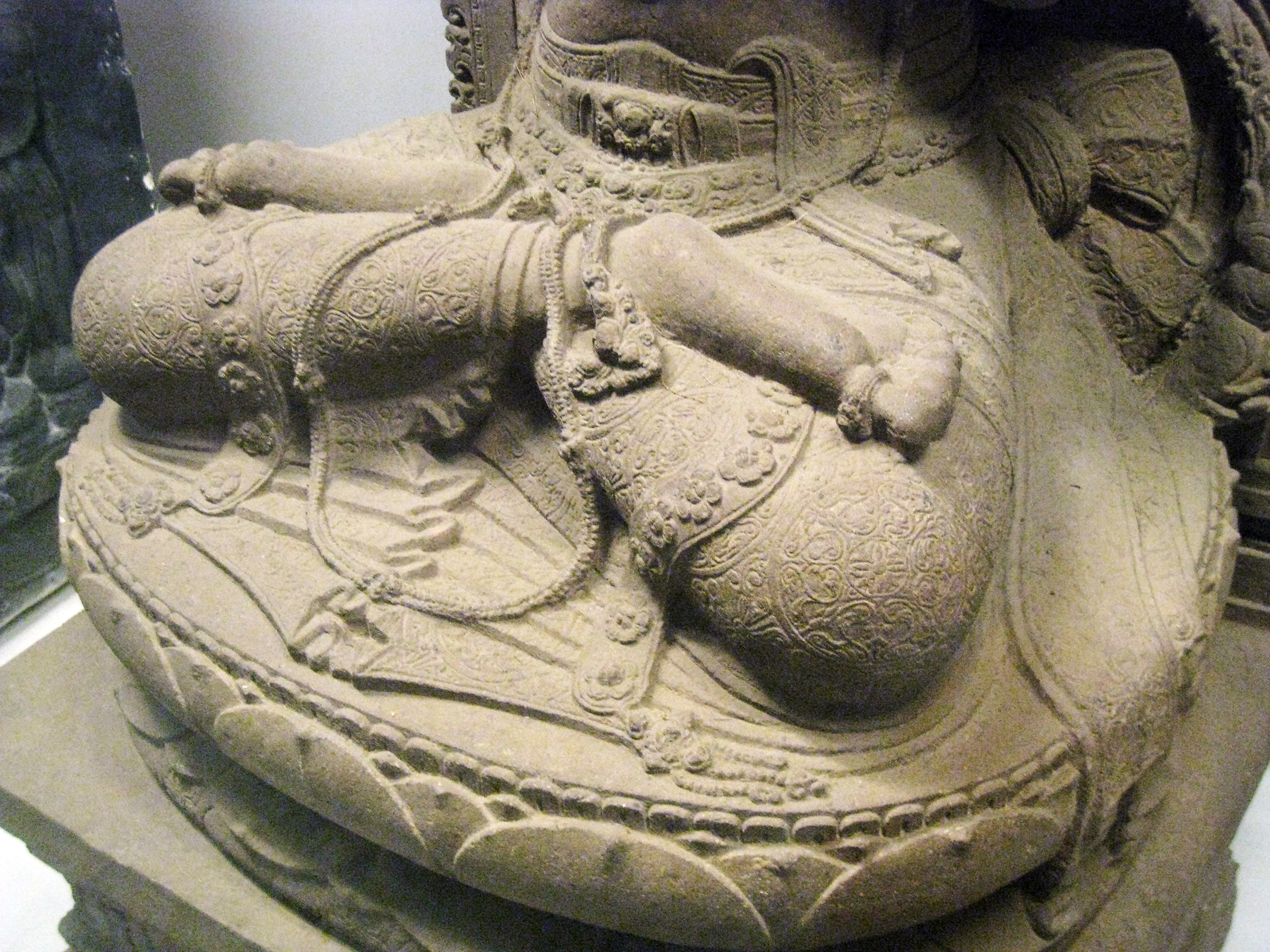
Clothing detail of 13th-century East Javanese Prajnaparamita statue, National Museum of Indonesia, Jakarta

The art of batik is highly developed on the island of Java, Indonesia, although the antiquity of the technique is difficult to determine since batik pieces rarely survive long in the region's tropical climate. The Dutch historians G. G. Rouffaer & H. H. Juynboll argue that the technique might have been introduced during the 6th or 7th century from India or Sri Lanka. The similarities between some traditional batik patterns with clothing details in ancient Hindu-Buddhist statuaries, for example East Javanese Prajnaparamita, has made some authors attribute batik's creation to Java's Hindu-Buddhist period (8th-16th century AD). Some scholars cautioned that mere similarity of pattern is not conclusive of batik, as it could be made by other non-related techniques. Since the word "batik" is not attested in any pre-Islamic sources, some scholars have taken the view that batik only developed at the end of Java's Hindu-Buddhist period, from the 16th century onward, following the demise of Majapahit kingdom. However, this view has not taken into account the oldest surviving physical Javanese batik piece, which was only identified in 2022. It is a blue-white valance carbon dated to the 13th or 14th century, which corresponds to the early Majapahit period. The batik's quality and dating suggest that sophisticated batik techniques already existed at the time, but competed with the more established ikat textiles.

Batik craft further flourished in the Islamic courts of Java in the following centuries. The development of prominent batik types was partly motivated by the desire to replicate prestigious foreign textiles (such as Indian patola) brought in by the Indian Ocean maritime trade. When the Dutch East Indies Company began to impose their monopolistic trade practice in 17th century Indonesia, batik cloths were one of the products that stifled their textile sales. Dutch imports of chintz from the Coromandel coast could not compete with locally made batik due to their robust production and high quality.

=== Modern period ===
Modern pieces and representation of batik cloths

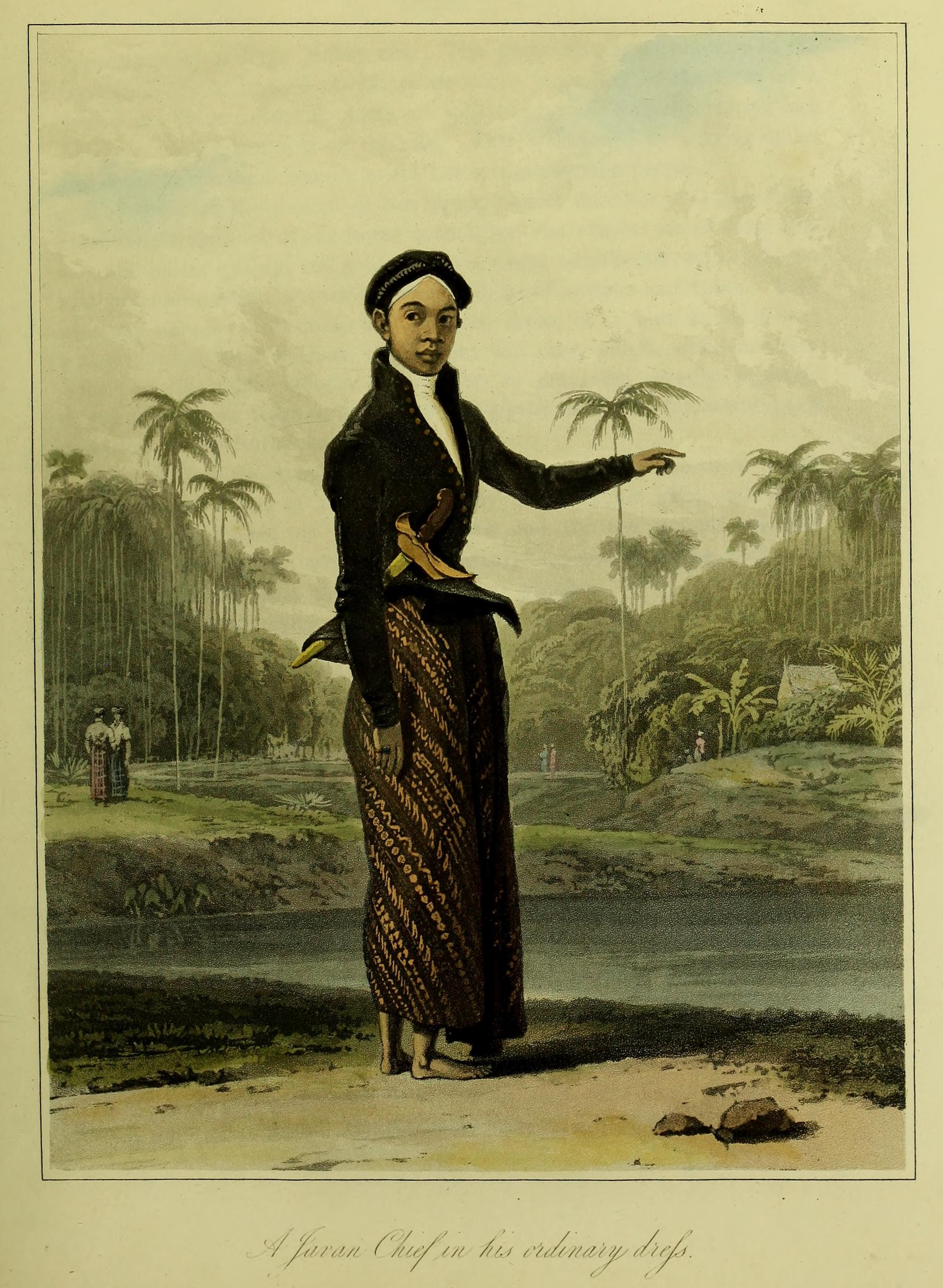
Depiction of an early 19th-century Javanese citizen wearing batik sarong, from The History of Java

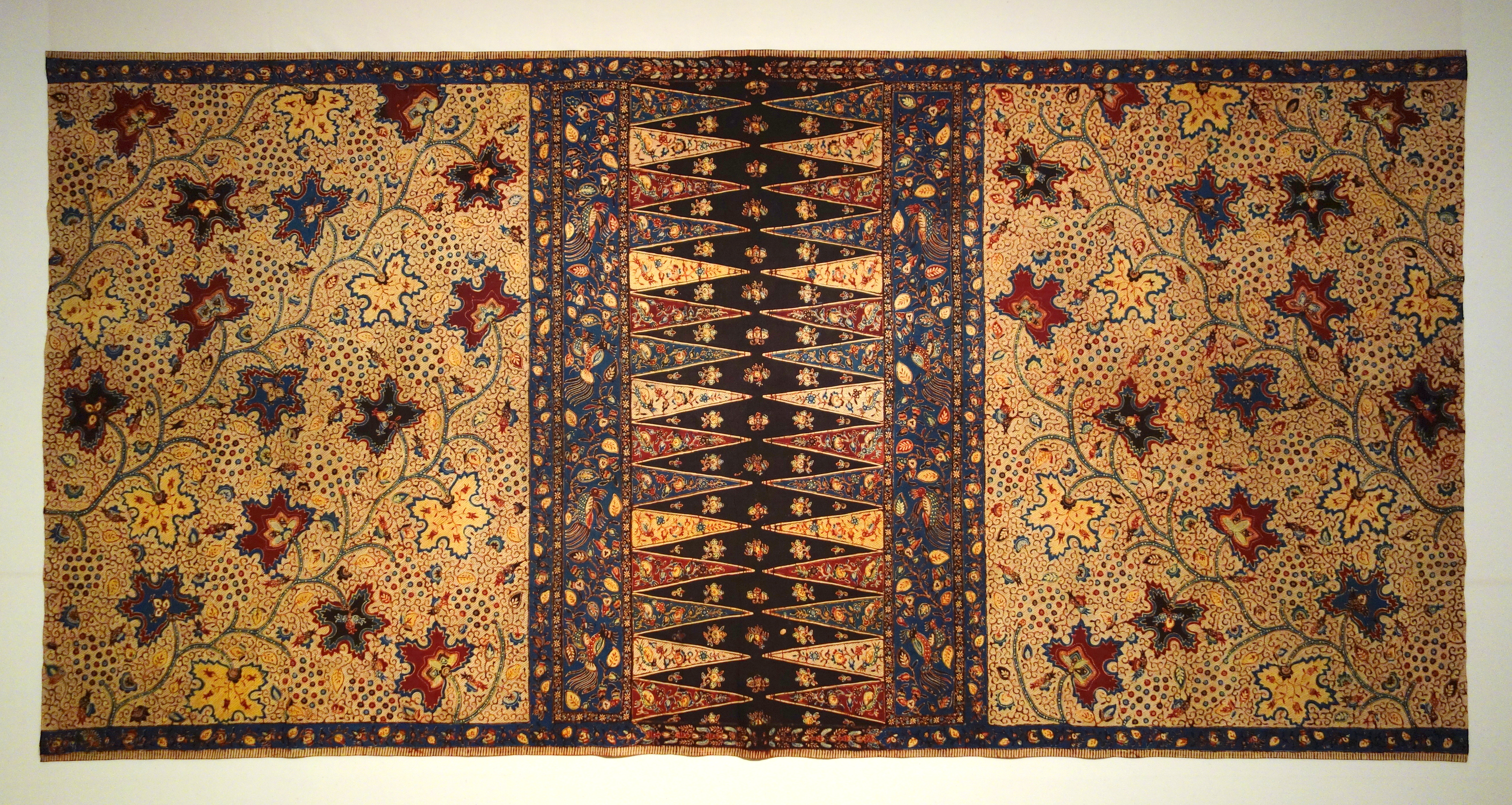
Sarong in the pesisir "coastal" style from northern Javanese coast, early 20th century

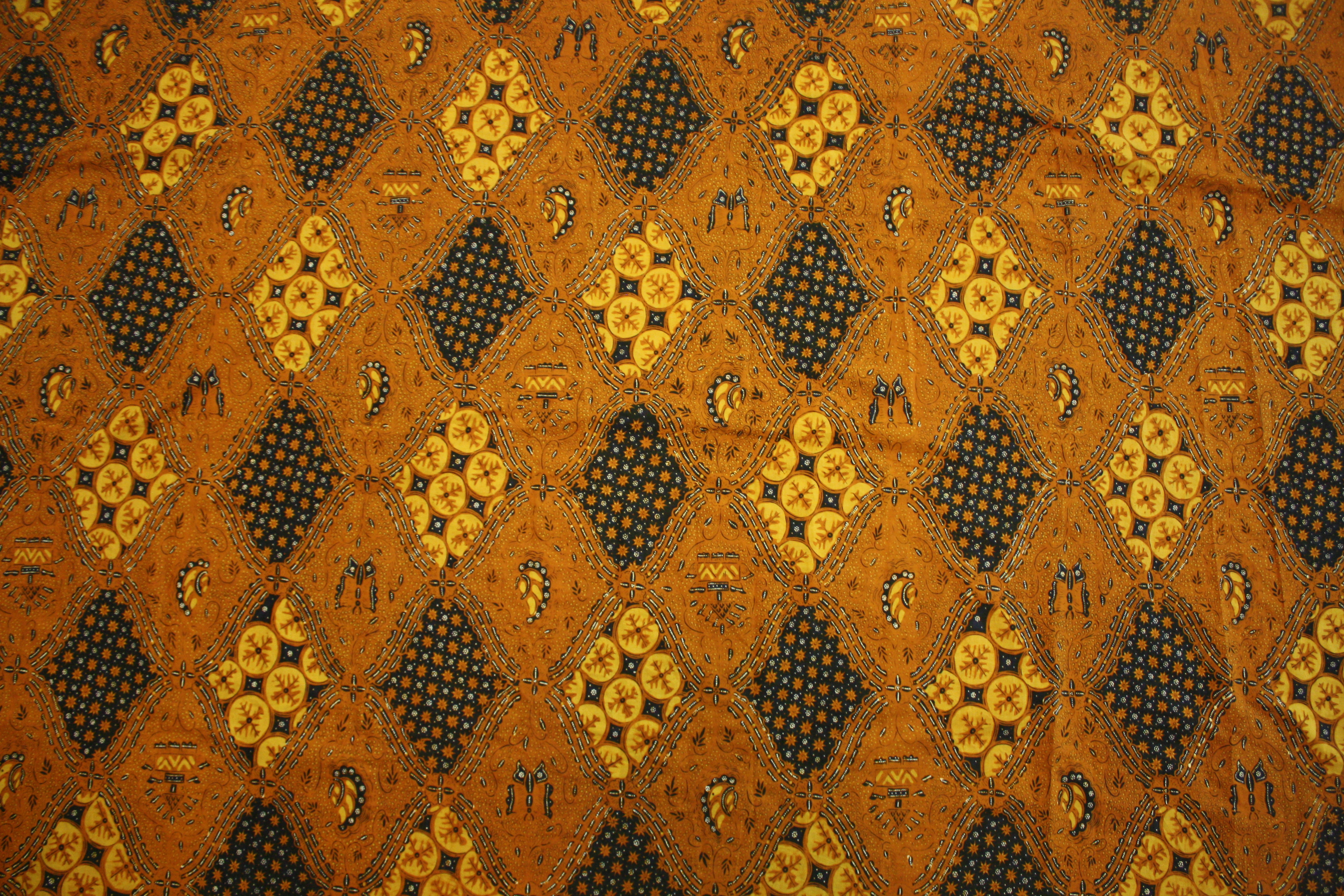
Contemporary inland batik from Solo, Indonesia, with sidha drajat pattern.

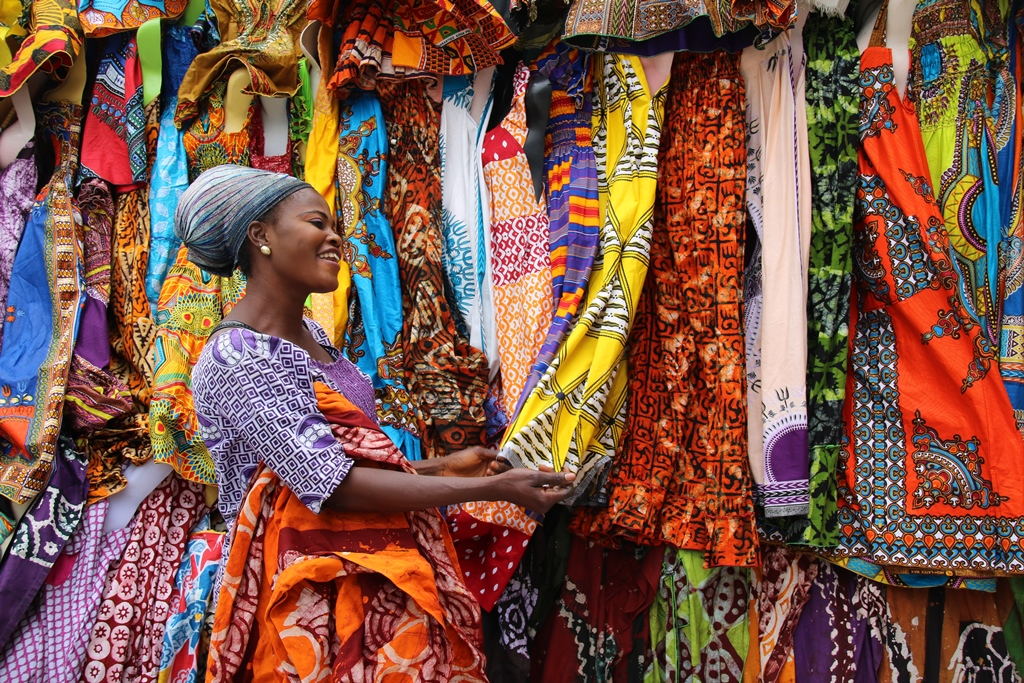
Waxprint fabrics in Togo, a modern African adaptation of Javanese batik

Batik technique became more widely known (particularly by Europeans outside of Southeast Asia) when the Javanese version was described in The History of Java, starting the collecting and scholarly interest in batik traditions. In 1873, the Dutch merchant Elie Van Rijckevorsel gave the pieces he collected during a trip to Indonesia to the ethnographic museum in Rotterdam. Examples were displayed at Paris's Exposition Universelle in 1900. Today the Tropenmuseum houses the biggest collection of Indonesian batik in the Netherlands.

In the 19th to early 20th century, Dutch Indo–Europeans and Chinese settlers were actively involved in the production and development of Javanese batik, particularly pesisir "coastal" style batik in the northern coast of Java. Scholars such as J.E. Jasper and Mas Pirngadi published books extensively documenting existing batik patterns. These in turn were used by Dutch and Chinese artisans to develop new patterns which blended several cultural influences, and who also introduced innovations such as cap (copper block stamps) to mass-produce batiks and synthetic dyes which allow brighter colours. Several prominent batik ateliers appeared, such as Eliza van Zuylen (1863–1947) and Oey Soe Tjoen (1901–1975), and their products catered to a wide audience in the Malay Archipelago (encompassing modern Indonesia, Malaysia, and Singapore). Batik skirts and sarongs, for example, were widely worn by indigenous, Chinese, and European women of the region, paired with the ubiquitous kebaya shirt. Batik was also used for more specialised applications, such as peranakan altar cloth called tok wi (桌帷).

It is in this time period as well that the Javanese batik production spread overseas. In Subsaharan Africa, Javanese batik was introduced in the 19th century by Dutch and English merchants. It was subsequently modified by local artisans with larger motifs, thicker lines, and more colours into what is now known as African wax prints. Modern West African versions also use cassava starch, rice paste, or mud as a resist. In the 1920s, Javanese batik makers migrating to the eastern coast of Malay Peninsula introduced batik production using stamp blocks.

Many traditional ateliers in Java collapsed immediately following the Second World War and Indonesian wars of independence, but many workshops and artisans are still active today, creating a wide range of products. They still continue to influence a number of textile traditions and artists. In the 1970s, for example, batik was introduced to Australia, where aboriginal artists at Ernabella have developed it as their own craft. The works of the English artist Thetis Blacker were influenced by Indonesian batik; she had worked in Yogyakarta's Batik Research Institute and had travelled in Bali.

== Techniques ==
Production begins by washing the base cloth, (Note: Batik applies resist on woven fabric, in contrast to ikat which applies resist to the yarns prior to weaving.) soaking it, and beating it with a large mallet. Patterns are sketched with pencil and redrawn using hot wax, usually made from a mixture of paraffin or beeswax, sometimes mixed with plant resins. The wax functions as a dye-resist which prevents colour absorption during the dyeing process. This creates a patterned negative when the wax is removed from the dyed cloth. Using this mechanism, artisans may create intricate coloured patterns with multiple cycles of wax application and dyeing.

Principle of resist dyeing used in batik: a wax negative is created, enabling an area of any desired shape to be coloured.

The wax can be applied with a variety of tools, including writing with a pen-like canting tool, printing with a cap, or painting with a brush. The canting is the most basic and traditional tool, creating what is known as "written batik" (batik tulis). It allows the creation of very fine, minute patterns but the process is very labour-intensive. Stamped batik (batik cap) allows more efficient production for larger quantities at the expense of detail.

=== Written batik ===
Written batik or batik tulis (Javanese script: ꦧꦛꦶꦏ꧀ꦠꦸꦭꦶꦱ꧀; Pegon: باطيء توليس) is made by writing molten wax on the cloth with a pen-like instrument called a canting (Javanese pronunciation: [tʃantiŋ], old spelling tjanting). It is a small copper reservoir with a spout on a wooden handle. The reservoir holds the resist, which flows through the spout, creating dots and lines as it moves. The cloth is then dipped in a dye bath and left to dry. The resist is removed by boiling or scraping the cloth. The areas treated with resist keep their original colour; when the resist is removed, the contrast between the dyed and undyed areas forms the pattern. The process is repeated as many times as the number of colours desired.

Written batik using canting

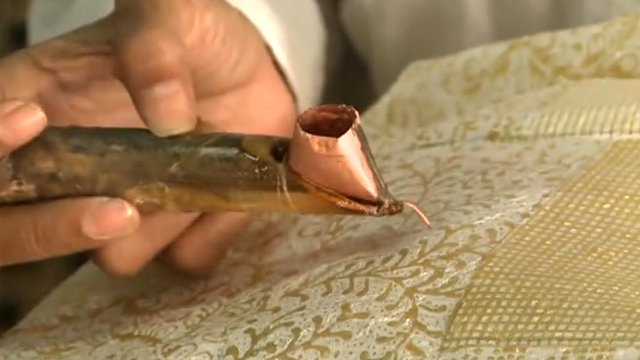
A canting in use to draw a resist pattern in molten wax

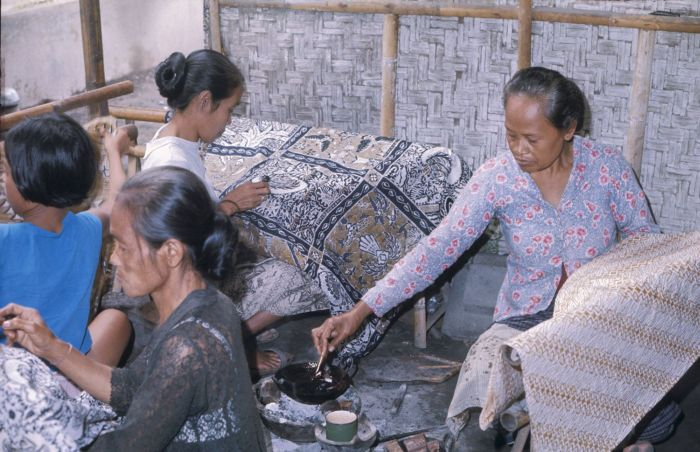
Written batik, drawing patterns with wax using canting in Java

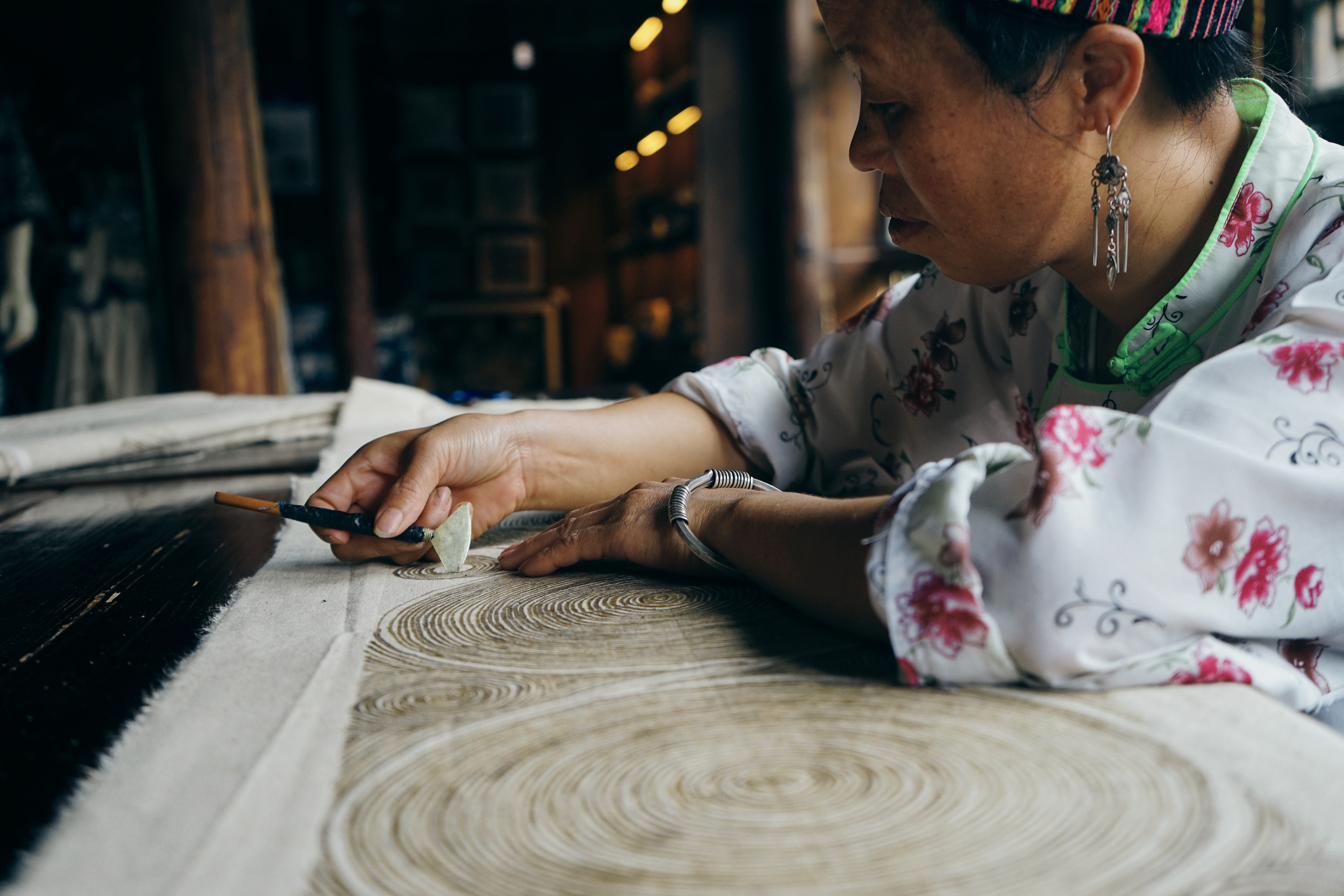
A canting variant called ladao used by the Miao people of Guizhou

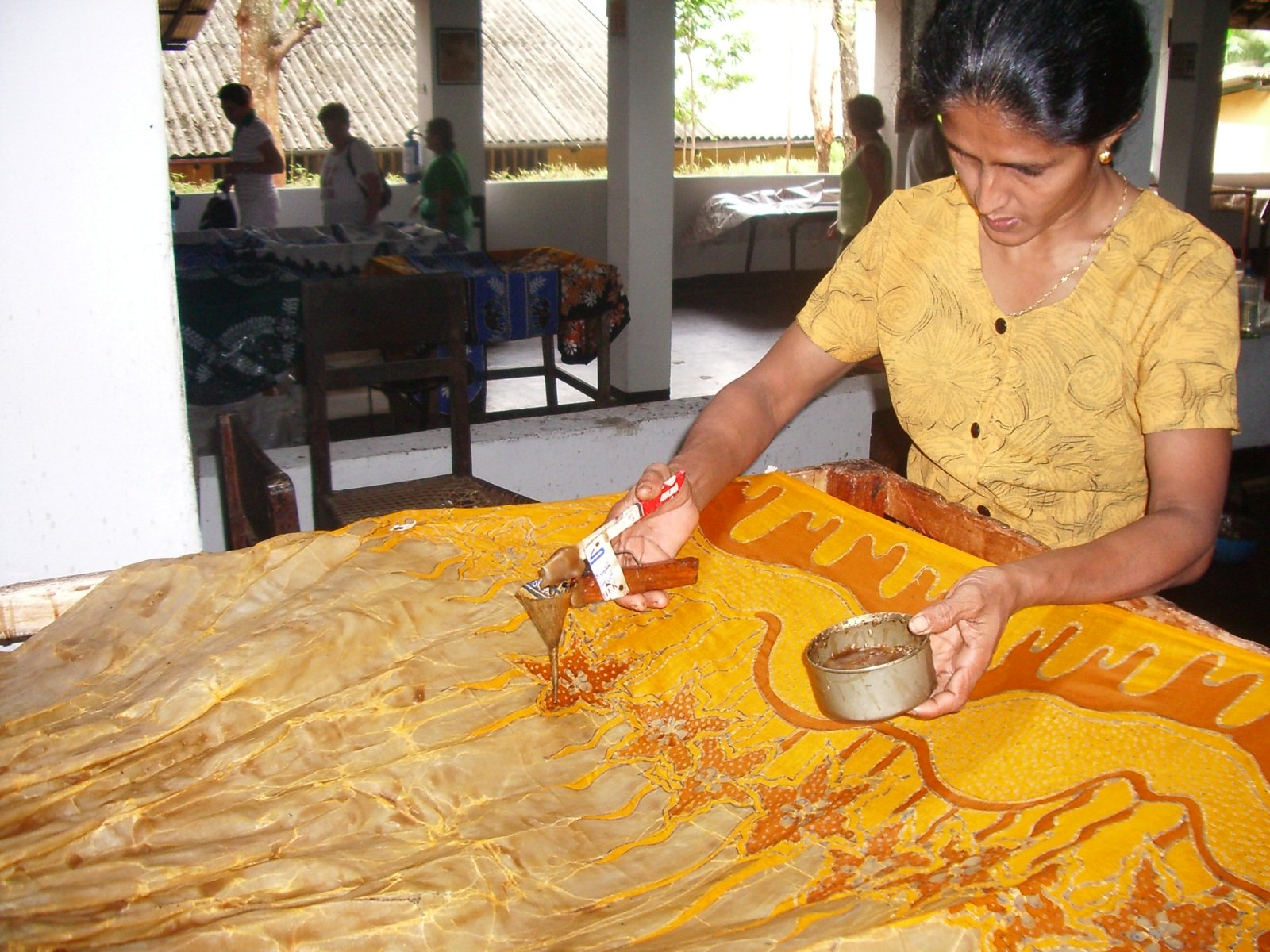
A canting variant used in Sri Lanka for thick outlines

=== Stamped batik ===
Stamped batik or batik cap (Javanese script: ꦧꦛꦶꦏ꧀ꦕꦥ꧀; Pegon: باطيء چاڤ) is batik whose manufacturing process uses a cap (Javanese pronunciation: [tʃap]; old spelling tjap) stamp with carved motifs to print an area of the cloth with the resist. The material of the stamp can vary. Medieval Indian stamps tend to use wood. Modern Javanese stamps are made of copper strips and wires, the manufacture of which is a highly skilled process. The rest of the dyeing process is the same as for written batik. The replacement of the canting with the cap reduces the effort needed to make a batik cloth, and hence the cost, but still requires skill.

Stamped batik using cap

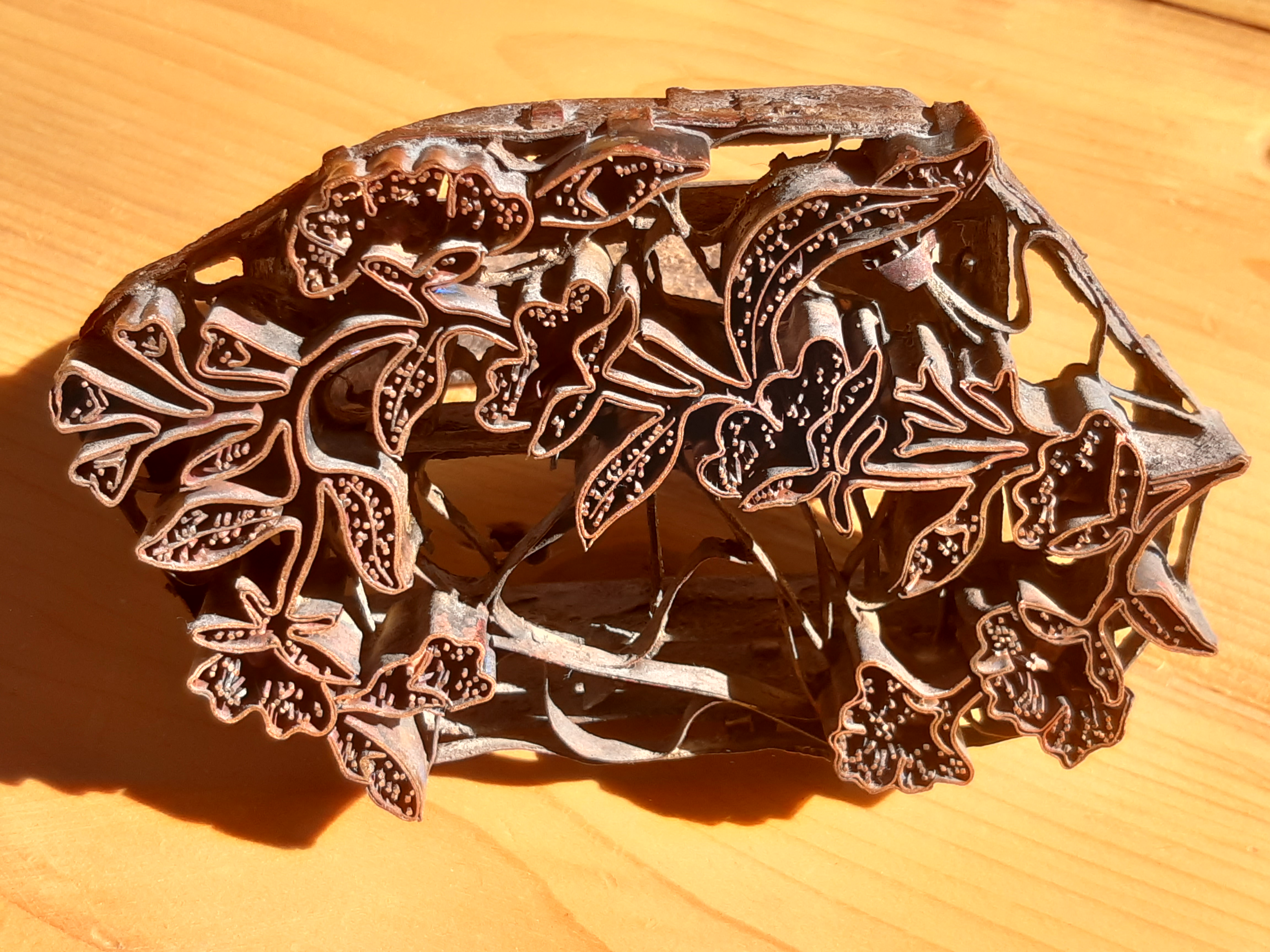
A handmade Javanese batik cap for stamping patterns, made of copper strips and wires

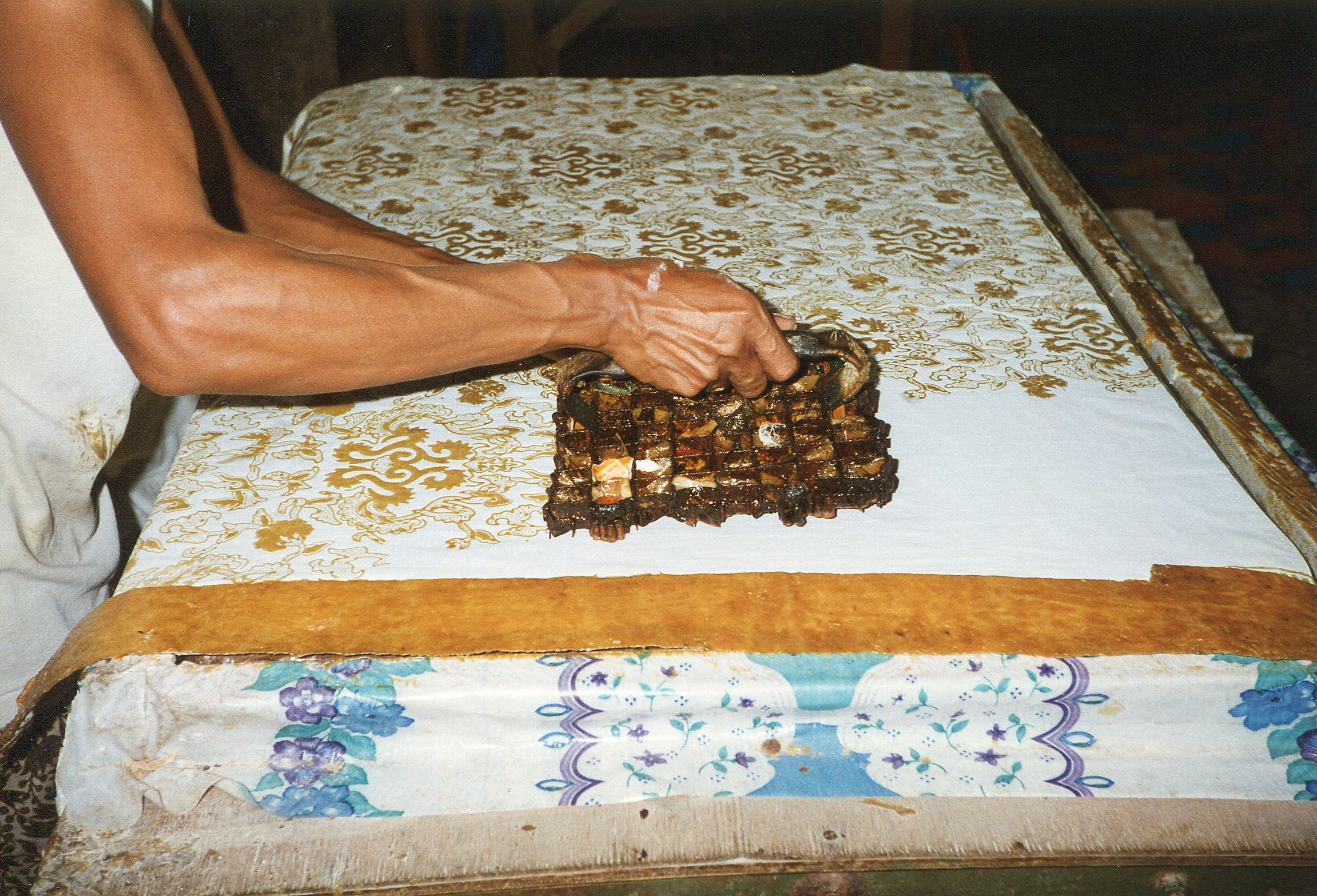
Hand-stamping batik using a cap in Java

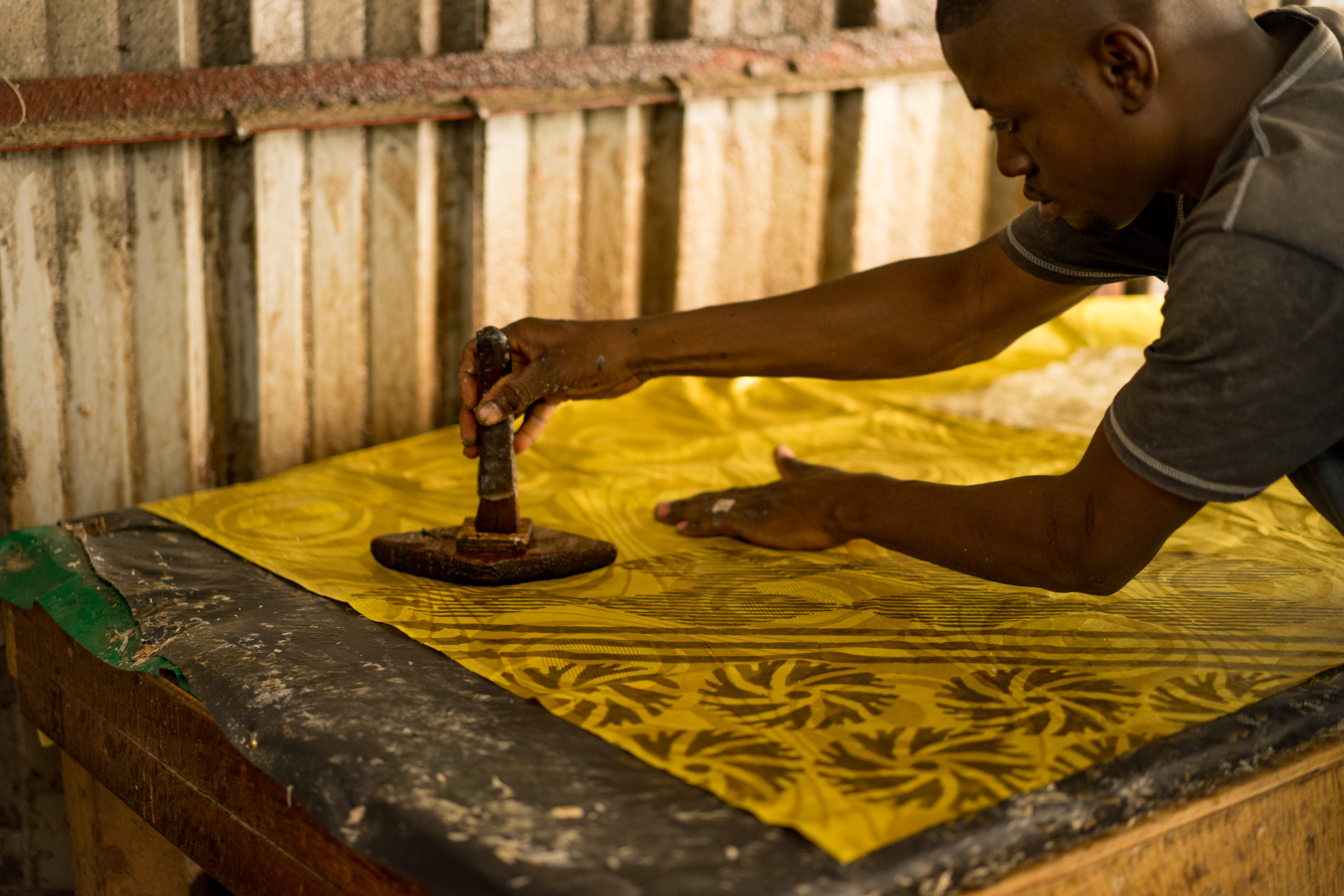
Hand-stamping batik using a cap tool in a Bamako workshop, Mali

=== Painted batik ===
Painted batik or batik lukis (Javanese script: ꦧꦛꦶꦏ꧀ꦭꦸꦏꦶꦱ꧀; Pegon: باطيء لوكيس) is a technique of making batik by painting (with or without a template) on a white cloth using a combination of tools such as the canting, brush, cotton, or sticks to apply the resist, according to the painter. Brush application is especially useful to cover large areas of a cloth. Batik painting is a development of traditional batik art, producing contemporary (free) motifs or patterns. It may use more colours than are traditional in written batik.

Painted batik using brushes

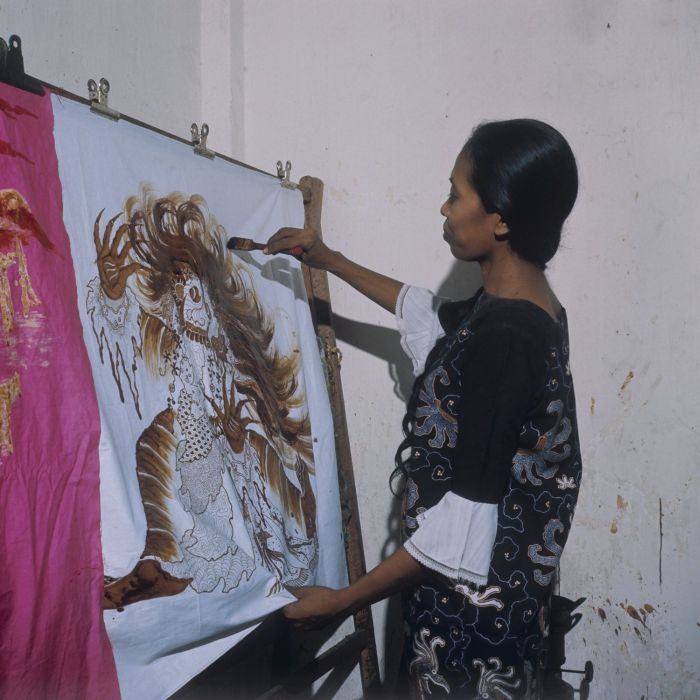
A craftwoman in Yogyakarta making a Rangda wax motif using a brush.

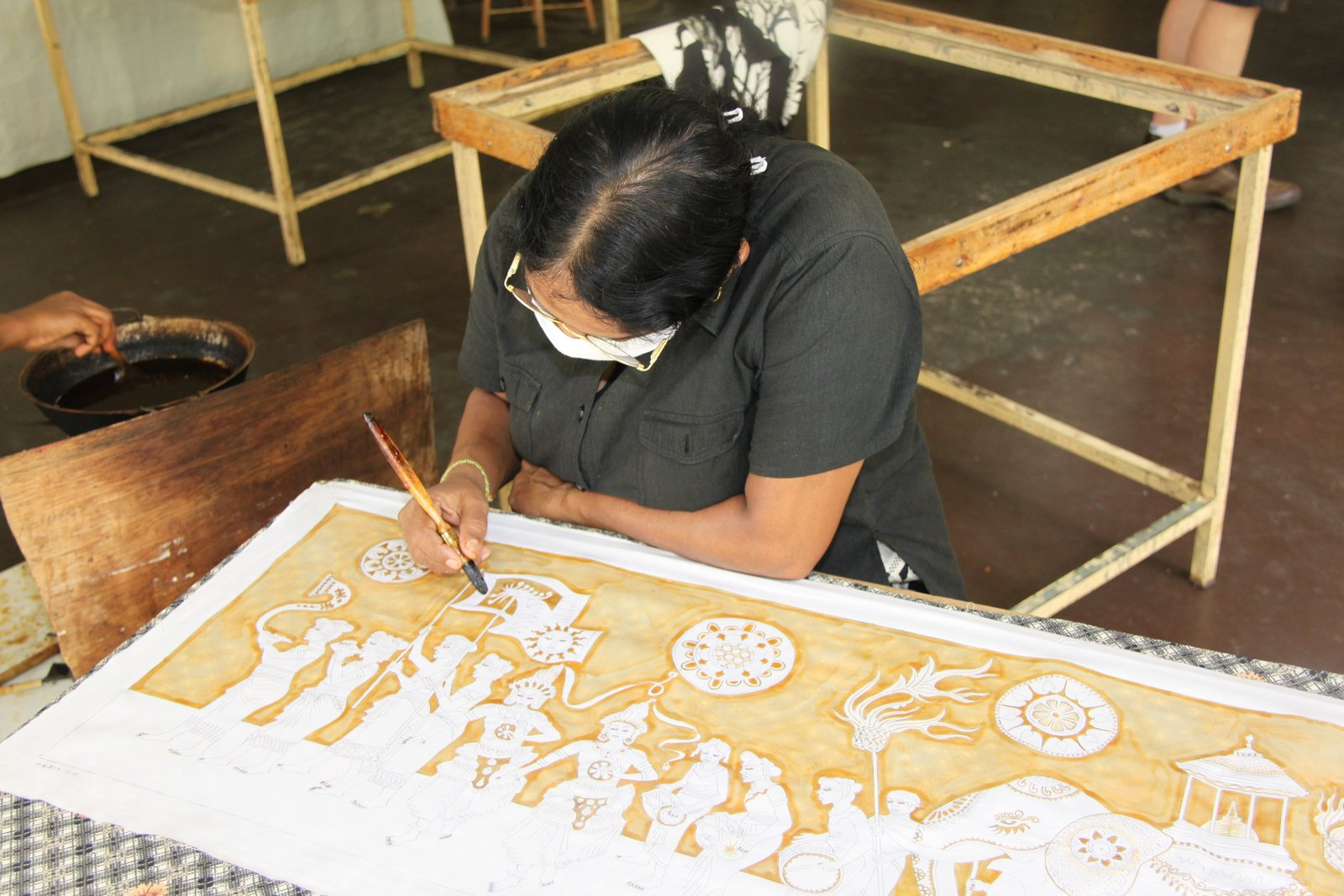
Craftswoman brush painting with wax in Kandy, Sri Lanka. Note the large cover area of the wax

=== Dyeing ===
The dyeing process is similar regardless of the wax application technique. Waxed cloths are dipped in vats of dye according to the desired colour. Wax is then scraped off or removed by boiling water, leaving a patterned negative on the cloth. The wax application and dyeing are repeated as necessary. Before the invention of synthetic dyes, dyeing was one of the more technically complicated production stages, for several reasons. Natural dyes, mostly vegetal, do not always produce consistent colours between batches. Dyers must take into account how different dye shades interact when cloths go through multiple stages of dyeing with different colours. Many dyers use proprietary dye recipes for this reason, using locally sourced plant materials. Natural dyes also take longer to produce deep shades of colour, extending the dyeing process. Synthetic dyes greatly simplify the process, but produce chemical waste that may be harmful to the environment. Eco-friendliness is one reason some batik producers opt to use natural dyes, despite the availability of synthetic alternatives.

== Patterns and motifs ==
The patterns of batik textiles are particular to the time, place, and culture of their producers. In textile scholarship, most studies have focused on Indonesian batik patterns, as these drew from a wide range of cultural influences and are often symbolically rich. Some patterns are said to have loaded meanings and deep philosophies, with their use reserved for special occasions or groups of people (e.g. nobles, royalties). However, some scholars have cautioned that existing literature on Indonesian textiles over-romanticises and exoticises the purported meanings behind relatively mundane patterns. Some batik patterns (even if they are technically demanding and intricate) were created to satisfy market demand and fashion trends.

Cultural influences on Indonesian batik patterns
Cultural influences	Batik patterns	Geographic locations	Sample
Native Indonesian	Kawung, ceplok, gringsing, parang, lereng, truntum, sekar jagad (combination of motifs) and other decorative motifs such as of Javanese, Dayak, Batak, Papuan, Riau Malay.	Respective areas with their own patterns	
Hindu–Buddhist	Garuda, banji, cuwiri, kalpataru, meru or gunungan, semen rama, pringgondani, sidha asih, sidha mukti, sidha luhur	Java	
Islamic	Besurek or Arabic calligraphy, buraq	Bengkulu, Cirebon, Jambi	
Chinese	Burung hong (Chinese phoenix), liong (Chinese dragon), qilin, wadasan, megamendung (Chinese-style cloud), lok tjan	Lasem, Cirebon, Pekalongan, Tasikmalaya, Ciamis	
Indian	Jlamprang, peacock, elephant	Cirebon, Garut, Pekalongan, Madura	
European (colonial era)	Buketan (floral bouquet), European fairytale, colonial images such as house, horses, carriage, bicycle and European-dressed people	Java	
Japanese	sakura, hokokai, chrysanthemum, butterfly	Java	

== Cultures ==
=== Africa ===
African wax prints were introduced during the colonial era, through the Dutch textile industry's effort to imitate the batik-making process. The imitation was not successful in Indonesian market, but was welcomed in West and Central Africa. Nelson Mandela was a noted wearer of batik during his lifetime. Mandela regularly wore a patterned loose-fitting shirt to many business and political meetings during 1994–1999 and after his tenure as President of South Africa, subsequently dubbed as a Madiba shirt based on Mandela's Xhosa clan name. many claim the Madiba shirt's invention. According to Yusuf Surtee, a clothing-store owner who supplied Mandela with outfits for decades, the Madiba design is based on Mandela's request for a shirt similar to Indonesian president Suharto's batik attire.

=== China ===
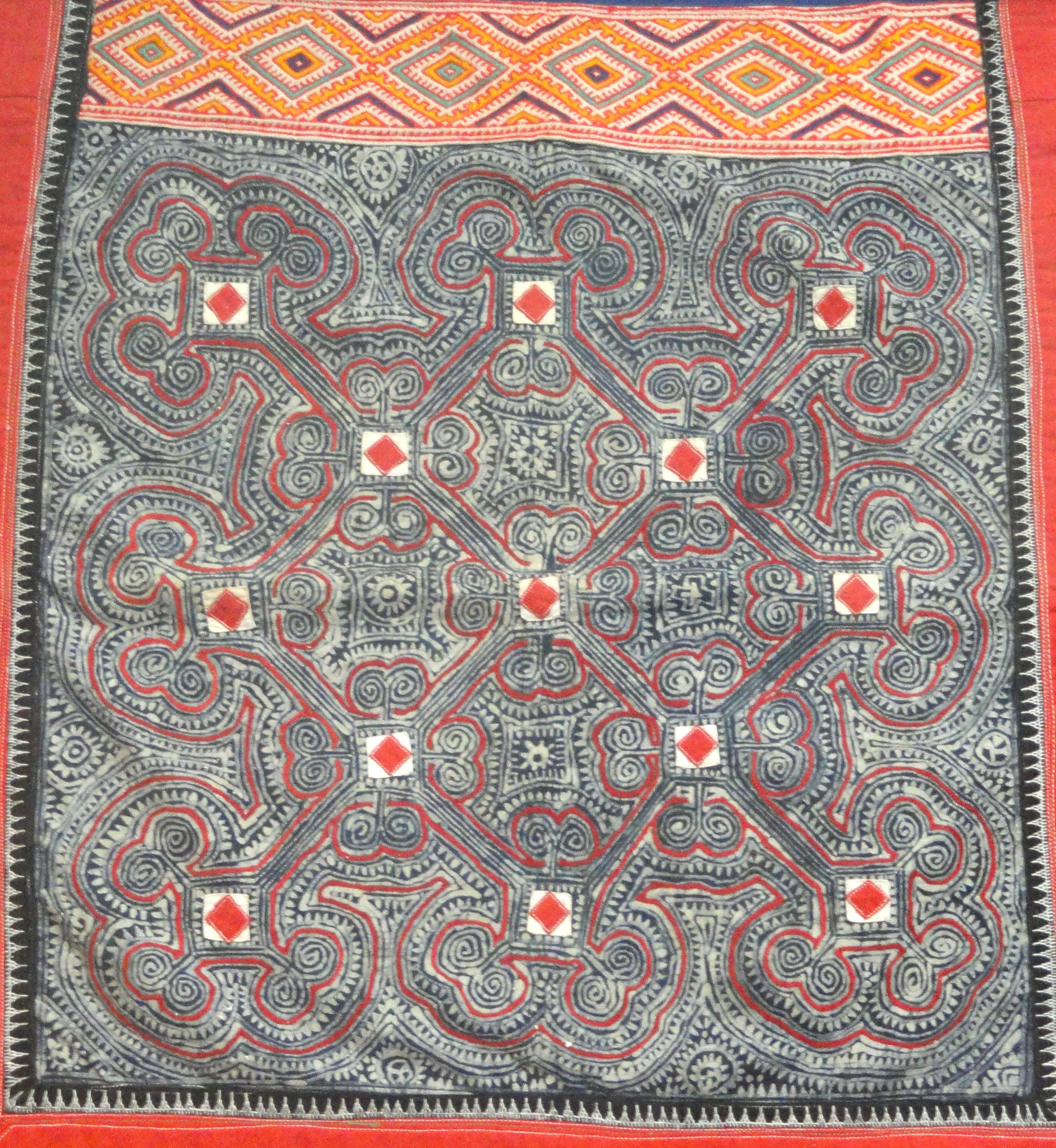
Miao baby-carrying quilt

Batik is made by ethnic peoples in the South-West of China, and in neighbouring countries including Thailand, Laos, and Vietnam, especially by hill tribes. The technique requires a ladao knife with two copper triangles mounted in a bamboo handle. Molten wax is held between the triangles and can then be dripped from the knife to form a resist pattern on the cloth. Some ladao knives have more than two triangles, holding more wax and creating thicker lines. The Miao, Bouyei and Gejia people use a dye resist method for some of their traditional costumes. Almost all the Miao decorate hemp and cotton by applying hot wax, and then dipping the cloth in an indigo dye. The cloth is then used for skirts, panels on jackets, aprons and baby carriers. Like the Javanese, their traditional patterns contain symbolism; the patterns include the dragon, phoenix, and flowers.

=== India ===
Indians use resist-dyeing with cotton fabrics. Initially, wax and even rice starch were used for printing on fabrics. Until recently, batik was made only for dresses and tailored garments, but modern batik is applied in numerous items, such as murals, wall hangings, paintings, household linen, and scarves, with livelier and brighter patterns. Contemporary batik making in India is done by the deaf women of Delhi, who are fluent in Indian Sign Language and work in other vocational programs. In 2026, India's Shantiniketan batik was recognized as a Geographical Indication (GI) Products of India.

=== Indonesia ===
Batik as worn in Indonesia

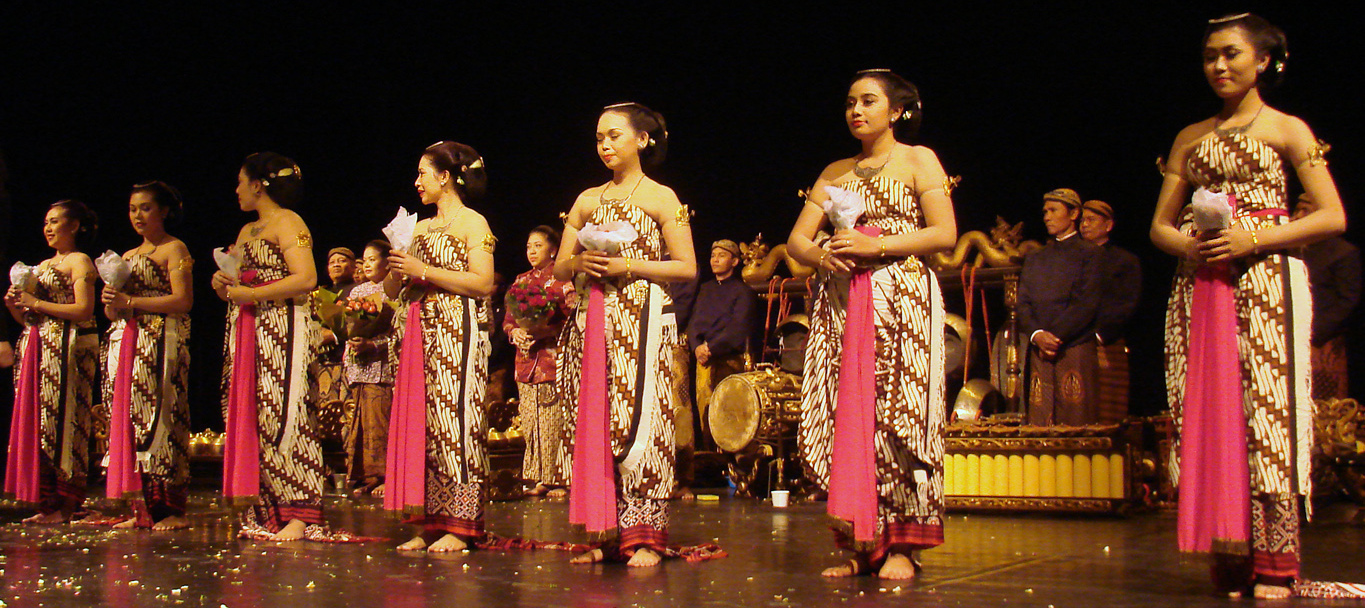
Dancers of Bedhaya, a royal dance from the palace of Surakarta, wearing costume with prescribed batik patterns

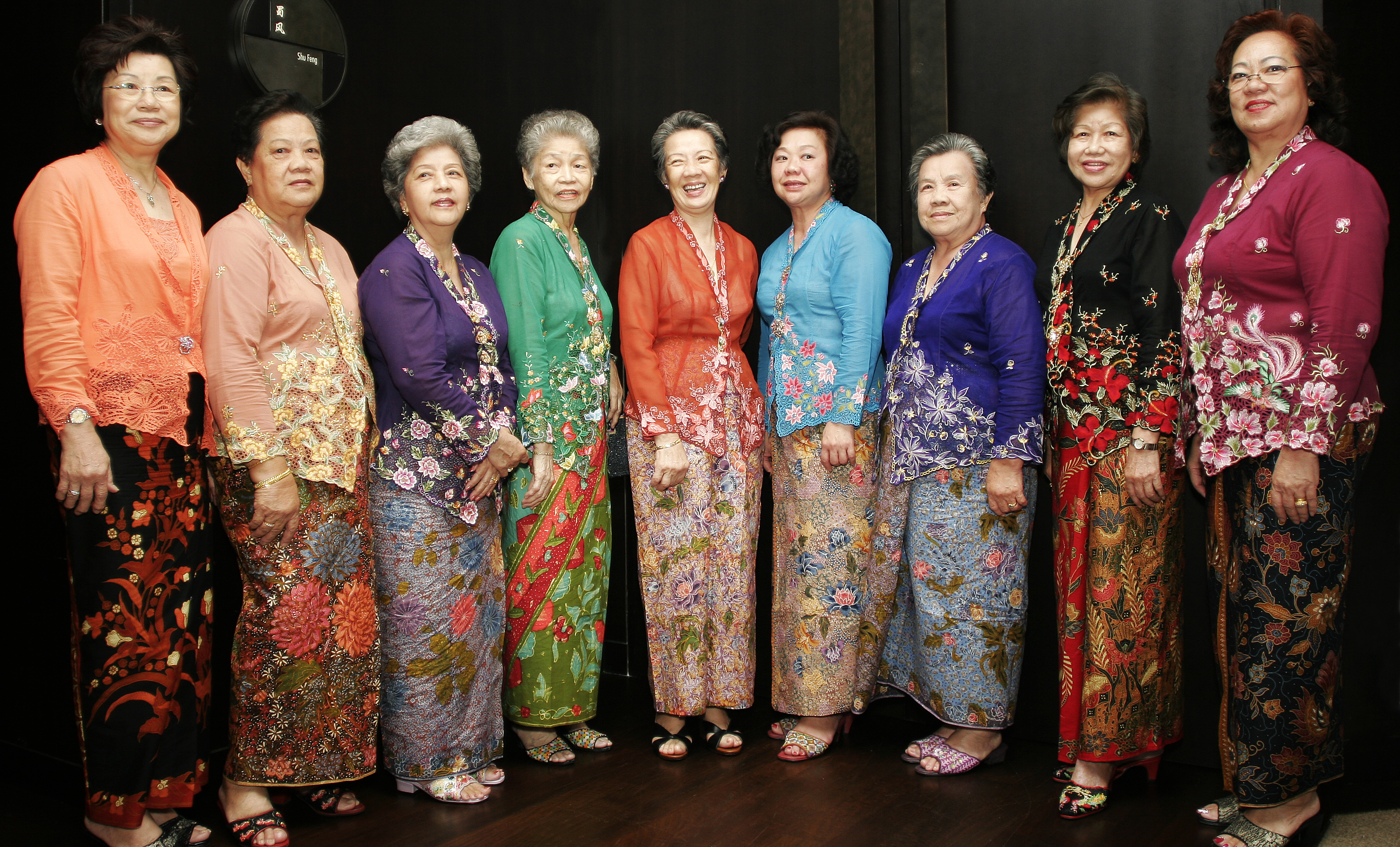
Batik sarongs with a variety of patterns worn freely according to individual taste

Batik plays multiple roles in the culture of Indonesia, especially in Javanese culture. The wax resist-dyeing technique has been used for centuries in Java, where certain motifs had symbolic meaning and prescribed use, indicating a person's level in society. It is an essential component in the attires of Javanese royal palaces, worn by monarchs, nobilities, abdi (palace staff), guards, and dancers. On the other hand, there are non-ceremonial batik which has long been treated as a trade commodity, with usage that are determined by taste, fashion, and affordability. Today in Indonesia, batik pattern is commonly seen on shirts, dresses, and other everyday attire.

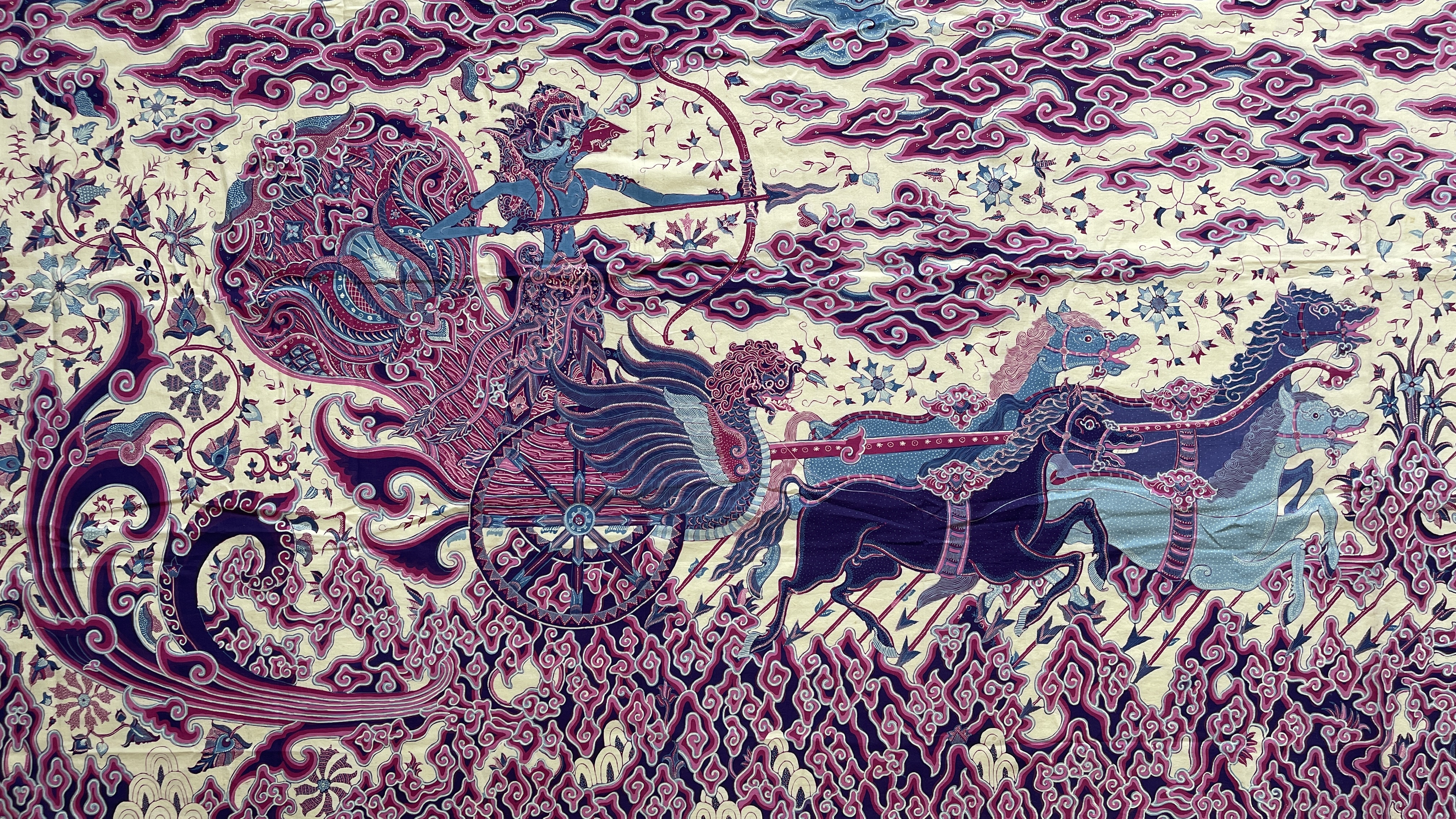
Batik Art from Cirebon depicting a scene from the Mahabharata with Krishna and Arjuna on chariot

On 2 October 2009, UNESCO recognized written batik (batik tulis) and stamped batik (batik cap) as a Masterpiece of Oral and Intangible Heritage of Humanity from Indonesia. Since then, Indonesia has celebrated a Batik Day (Hari Batik Nasional) annually on 2 October. In the same year, UNESCO recognized education and training in Indonesian Batik as a Masterpiece of Oral and Intangible Heritage of Humanity.

=== Malaysia ===
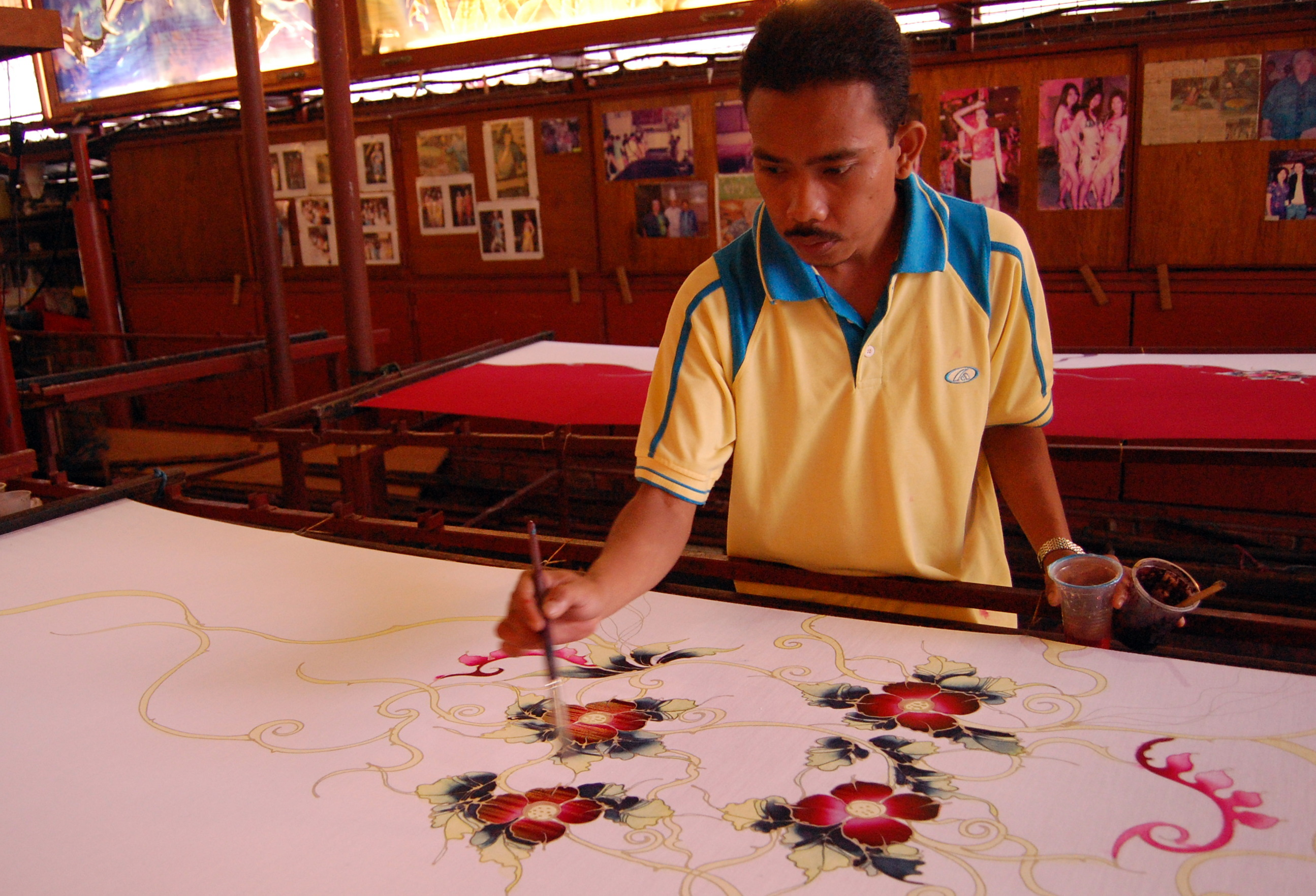
Craftsman in Malaysia creating a typical floral motif with light colouring

Trade relations between the Malay kingdoms in Sumatra and Malay peninsula with Javanese coastal cities have thrived since the 13th century. The northern coastal batik-producing areas of Java (Cirebon, Lasem, Tuban, and Madura) have influenced Jambi batik, which, along with Javanese batik, subsequently influenced the craft in the Malay Peninsula. Later, in the 1920s, a new influx of Javanese batik makers introduced stamped batik to the peninsula. The batik industry today provides significant benefit to the Malaysian economy, and the Malaysian government supports efforts to promote their own artisans and their products abroad.

Fiona Kerlogue, of the Horniman Museum, noted several differences between Malaysian batik and traditional Indonesian batik. Malaysian batik patterns tend to be larger and simpler, making only occasional use of the canting for intricate patterns. They rely heavily on brush painting to apply colours to fabrics. The colours are usually lighter and more vibrant than the deep-coloured Javanese batik popular in Indonesia. The most popular motifs are leaves and flowers; Malaysian batik often displays plants and flowers to avoid the interpretation of human and animal images as idolatry, in accordance with local Islamic doctrine. Despite these differences, confusion between Malaysian and Indonesian batik has led to some disputes in the Indonesia-Malaysia bilateral relations. (Note: Cultural claims of batik (especially its purported "origins") is one of the disputes that has come up time to time. Malaysian made batik are prone to be accused as cultural appropriation by some Indonesian sources, while some Malaysian sources countered that these accusations only came up because Indonesian government were negligent in supporting their own batik industry and heritage.)

=== Sri Lanka ===
Over the past century, batik making in Sri Lanka has become firmly established. The batik industry in Sri Lanka is a small-scale industry which can employ individual design talent. It mainly deals with foreign customers for profit. In the 21st century, it has become the most visible of the island's crafts; galleries and factories, large and small, have sprung up in many tourist areas. For example, rows of small batik stalls can be found all along Hikkaduwa's Galle Road strip. Mahawewa, on the other hand, is famous for its batik factories.

== See also ==
- Bagh print
- Balinese textiles
- Folk costume
- Tenun
- Ikat
- Malong
- National costume of Indonesia
- Screen printing
- Songket
- Textile printing
- T'nalak
- Tsutsugaki, Japanese resist-dyeing using starch, not wax

== Sources ==
- Barnes, Ruth; Duggan, Geneviève; Gavin, Traude; Hamilton, Roy; Nabholz-Kartaschoff, Marie-Louise; Babcock, Tim; Niessen, Sandra (16 September 2020). "Review of Peter ten Hoopen's Ikat Textiles of the Indonesian Archipelago". SSRN Electronic Journal. doi:10.2139/ssrn.3695773.
- Blust, Robert (December 1995). "The Prehistory of the Austronesian-Speaking Peoples: A View from Language" (PDF). Journal of World Prehistory. 9 (4): 453–510. doi:10.1007/BF02221119.
- van Brussel, Tim (2021). The production of batik in eighteenth century Java (bachelor thesis). Leiden: Universiteit Leiden.
- Elliott, Inger McCabe (1984). Batik: fabled cloth of Java. New York: Clarkson N. Potter Inc. ISBN 0-517-55155-1.
- Gillow, John; Sentance, Bryan (2000). World Textiles. Thames and Hudson. ISBN 978-0-500-01950-4.
- Grant, Terri; Nodoba, Gaontebale (August 2009). "Dress Codes in Post-Apartheid South African Workplaces". Business Communication Quarterly. 72 (3): 360–365. doi:10.1177/1080569909340683. S2CID 167453202.
- Gittinger, Mattiebelle (1979). Splendid Symbols: Textiles and Tradition in Indonesia. Singapore: Oxford University Press.
- Hajura, Shella (2022). "Shared Heritage Diplomacy of Indonesia and Malaysia as Soft Power in The Southeast Asia Region". Jurnal Hubungan Internasional. 10 (2): 84–95. doi:10.18196/jhi.v10i2.12194.
- Handayani, Widhi; Kristijanto, Augustinus Ign; Hunga, Arianti Ina Restiani (2018). "Behind the eco-friendliness of "batik warna alam"; Discovering the motives behind the production of batik in Jarum village, Klaten". Wacana, Journal of the Humanities of Indonesia. 19 (1): 235–256. doi:10.17510/wacana.v19i1.673.
- Harmsen, Olga (2018). Batik – How Emancipation of Dutch Housewives in the Dutch East Indies and "Back Home" Influenced Art Nouveau Design in Europe (PDF). cdf III Art Nouveau International Congress. Archived (PDF) from the original on 26 June 2022.
- Langewis, Laurens; Wagner, Frits A. (1964). Decorative Art in Indonesian Textiles. Amsterdam: CPJ van der Peet.
- Lee, Peter; Kerlogue, Fiona; Chiesa, Benjamin; Joseph, Maria Khoo (2015). Auspicious Designs: Batik for Peranakan Altars. Singapore: Asian Civilizations Museum.
- Lemi, Ladu D. M. (2024). "Commemorative textiles: an African narrative of identity and power". Humanities and Social Sciences Communications. 11 (1) 537. doi:10.1057/s41599-024-03051-z.
- Maxwell, Robyn (2003). Textiles of Southeast Asia: Tradition, Trade and Transformation. Singapore: Periplus.
- Nava, Nadia (1991). Il batik: come tingere e decorare i tessuti diegnando con la cera. Ulisse. ISBN 88-414-1016-7.
- Pullen, Lesley (2021). Patterned Splendour: Textiles Presented on Javanese Metal and Stone Sculptures, Eighth to Fifteenth Century. Singapore: ISEAS - Yusof Ishak Institute.
- Rouffaer, G. G.; Juynboll, H. H. (1899). De batik-kunst in Nederlandsch-Indië en haar geschiedenis. Haarlem: H Kleinmann & Co.
- Sardjono, Sandra; Buckley, Christopher (2022). "A 700-years old blue-and-white batik from Indonesia". Fiber, Loom and Technique: The Journal of the Tracing Patterns Foundation. 1: 64–78.
- Shaharuddin, Sharifah Imihezri Syed; Shamsuddin, Maryam Samirah; Drahman, Mohd Hafiz; Hasan, Zaimah; Asri, Nurul Anissa Mohd; Nordin, Ahmad Amri; Shaffiar, Norhashimah Mohd (2021). "A Review on the Malaysian and Indonesian Batik Production, Challenges, and Innovations in the 21st Century". SAGE Open. 11 (3) 21582440211040128. doi:10.1177/21582440211040128.
- Shen, Yuexiu; Wong, Mei Sheong (2023). "Qilin, Rabbit and Pencils: Batik Tokwi from Northcoast Java". In James Bennett; Russel Kelty (eds.). Interwoven Journeys: the Michael Abbott Collections of Asian Art. Adelaide: Art Gallery of South Australia (AGSA).
- Smend, Rudolf G.; Majlis, Brigitte Khan; Veldhuisen, Harmen C. (2013). Batik: From the Courts of Java and Sumatra. Singapore: Tuttle Publishing. Frontispiece. ISBN 978-146290695-6.
- Smith, Daniel (2014). How to Think Like Mandela. Michael O'Mara. ISBN 9781782432401.
- Sumarsono, Hartono; Ishwara, Helen; Yahya, L.R. Supriyapto; Moeis, Xeni (2016). Batik Garutan: Koleksi Hartono Sumarsono. Jakarta: Kepustakaan Populer Gramedia. ISBN 978-602-6208-09-5.
- Sumarsono, Hartono; Ishwara, Helen; Yahya, L.R. Supriyapto; Moeis, Xeni (2013). Benang Raja: Menyimpul Keelokan Batik Pesisir. Jakarta: Kepustakaan Populer Gramedia. ISBN 978-979-9106-01-8.
- Trefois, Rita (2010). Fascinating Batik: Technique and Practice. Belgium: Rita Trefois. ISBN 978-90-815246-2-9.
- Wijanarko, Fajar (2021). Wastra-Langkara: literasi busana bangsawan Yogyakarta. Jakarta: Perpusnas Press. ISBN 978-623-313-353-1.
