= List of songs recorded by Siti Nurhaliza =

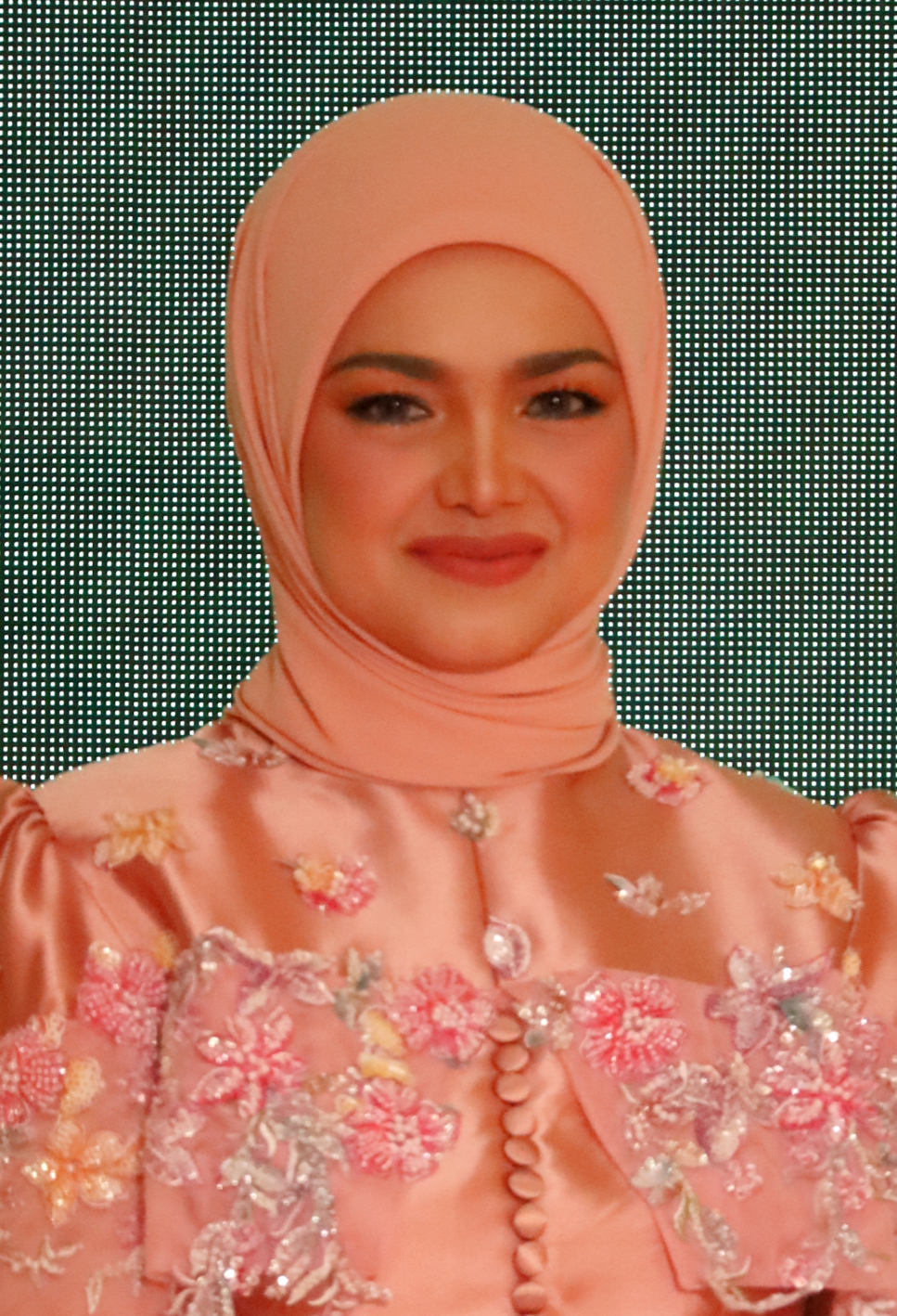
Siti Nurhaliza during her 30th anniversary celebration at Pavilion Kuala Lumpur in 2025.

Malaysian singer and songwriter Siti Nurhaliza has recorded material for 22 solo studio albums, two duet studio albums, and has been featured multiple times on songs and singles on various international and Malaysian artists' albums. Her debut album, Siti Nurhaliza I was released on 1 April 1996 by Suria Records after winning the 1995 RTM Bintang HMI singing competition at the age of 16. Before signing the contract with Suria Records, she was approached with offers from three different record labels including Sony Music, BMG Music and Warner Music. The release of her first single, "Jerat Percintaan" saw her rise to fame. In 1997, she was recognized as the Best New Female Artist and "Jerat Percintaan" was awarded the Best Song by Anugerah Industri Muzik. In the same year, the launch of her sophomore album Siti Nurhaliza II helped to propel her fame to Indonesia. In a news report by Billboard, Siti Nurhaliza II was reported to have been sold more than 500 000 units in Indonesia alone.

After releasing 10 solo studio albums with Suria Records, in 2006, she released her eleventh solo studio album through her own company, Siti Nurhaliza Productions. Her first album under her own label, Transkripsi received critical acclaim by Malaysian music critics and was recognized as the Best Album by Anugerah Industri Muzik in 2007. She subsequently released three more solo studio albums, Hadiah Daripada Hati (2007), Lentera Timur (2008), Tahajjud Cinta (2009) and one duet studio album, CTKD: Canda, Tangis, Ketawa, Duka (2009) with an Indonesian singer, Krisdayanti. In 2011, in a partnership with What's Up Entertainment, she released her first and only album that is fully recorded in English to date, All Your Love. In the same year, she announced that she will be managed by Universal Music Group (Malaysia). In 2014 and 2016, Fragmen and Unplugged earned her sixth and seventh win respectively for the Best Album award by Anugerah Industri Muzik. (Note: Her other albums that have been awarded the same title are Adiwarna, Seri Balas, E.M.A.S, Transkripsi and Lentera Timur.)

Although she is well known for her pop music, she was born and raised in a traditional music-inclined family. She has released five traditional solo albums, Cindai (1997), Sahmura (2000), Sanggar Mustika (2002), Lentera Timur (2008), Gema Bumantara (2025) and one traditional duet album with Noraniza Idris, Seri Balas (1999). Apart from recording her own material, she also has recorded various songs including theme songs for Malaysian and Indonesian films and television series such as "Bagaikan Sakti", "Ketika Cinta", "Muara Hati", "Jaga Dia Untukku", and "Seluruh Cinta". She also has been involved with the recording of various campaign jingles for both government and non-government organizations including "1 Malaysia", "Cuti-Cuti Malaysia", "Membaca Gaya Wawasan", "Kau Ilhamku", "Cinta Tanpa Sempadan", and many others. Apart from singing in Malaysian, Indonesian, and English, she has also recorded songs in Mandarin Chinese and Arabic.

Following is a list of songs recorded by Siti Nurhaliza in alphabetical order. Literal or close translations for non-English songs are provided where available.

== Songs ==
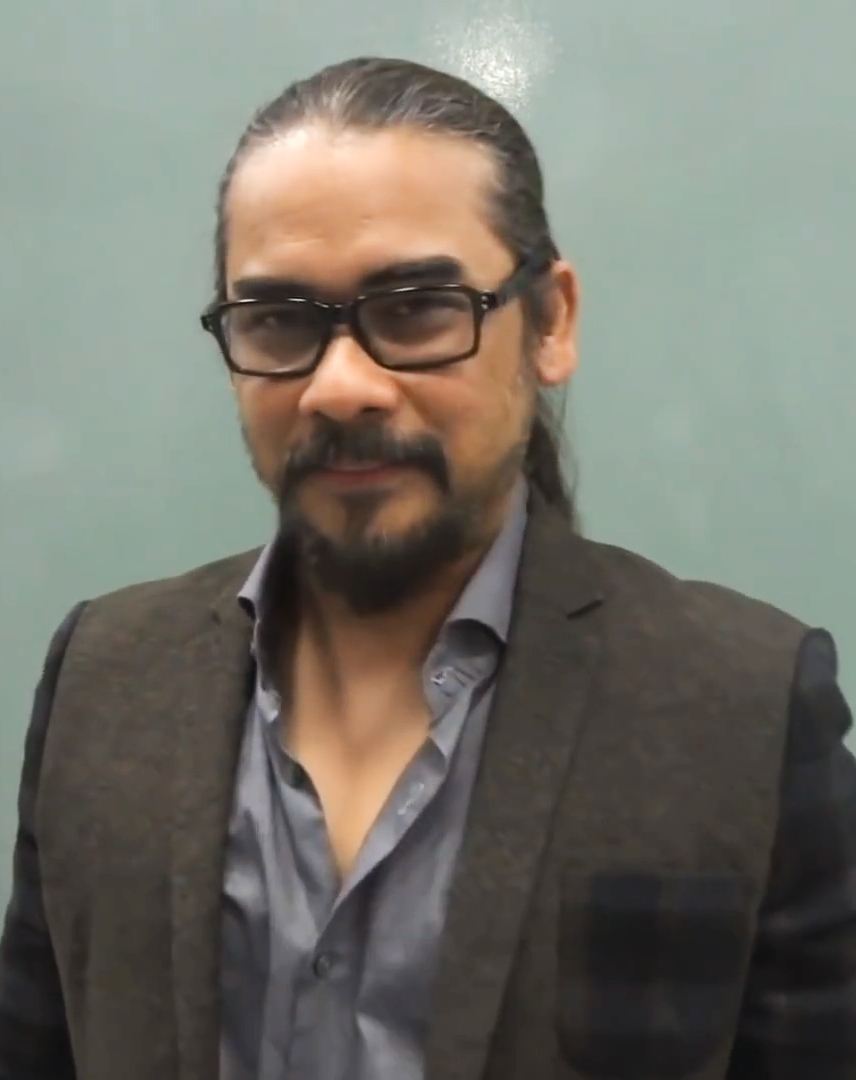
Malaysian singer Awie served as Siti's duet partner on "Kalau Berkasih".

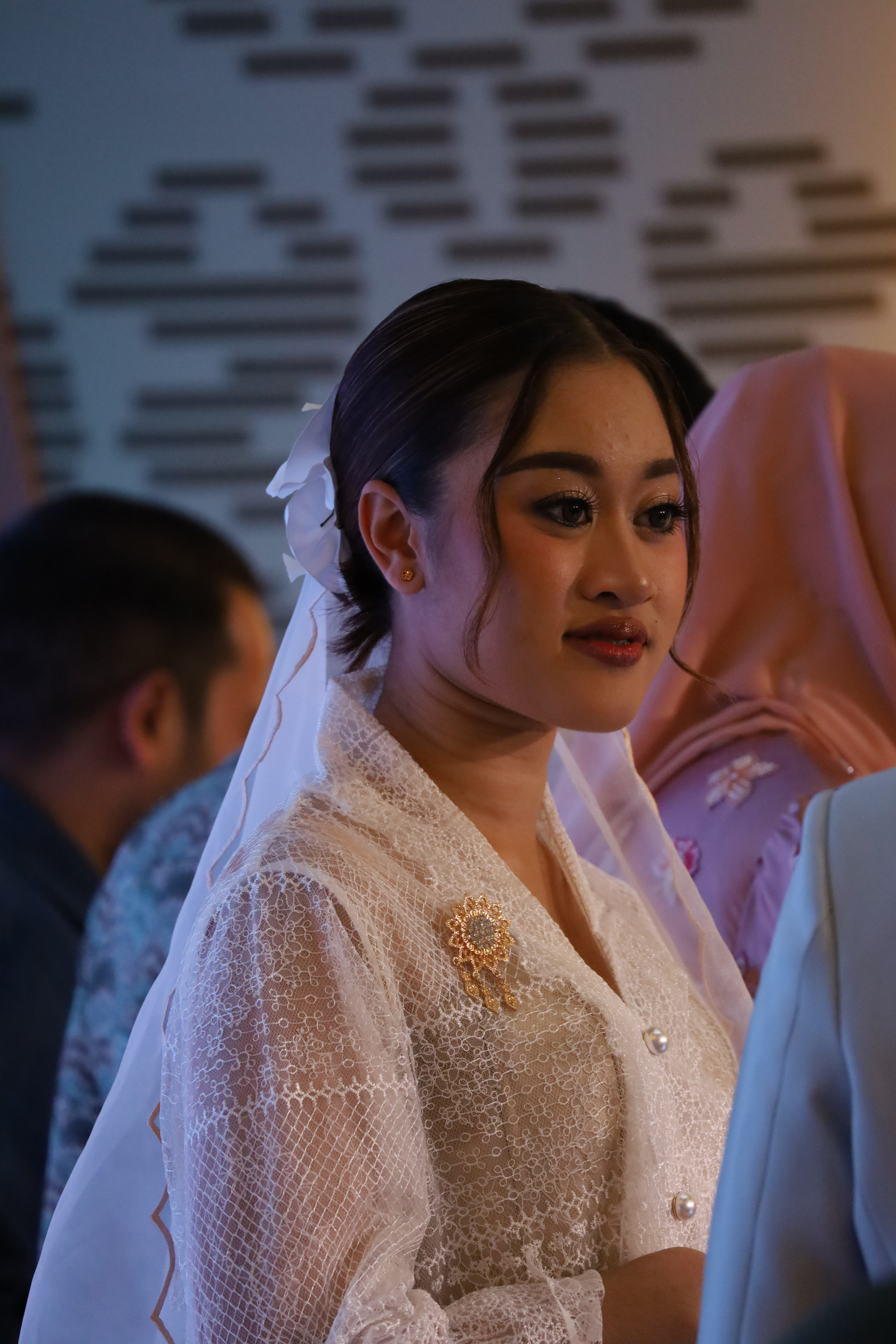
Malaysian singer Aisha Retno wrote the lyrics and music for "Kesuma" and "Raya Nak Ke Mana?".

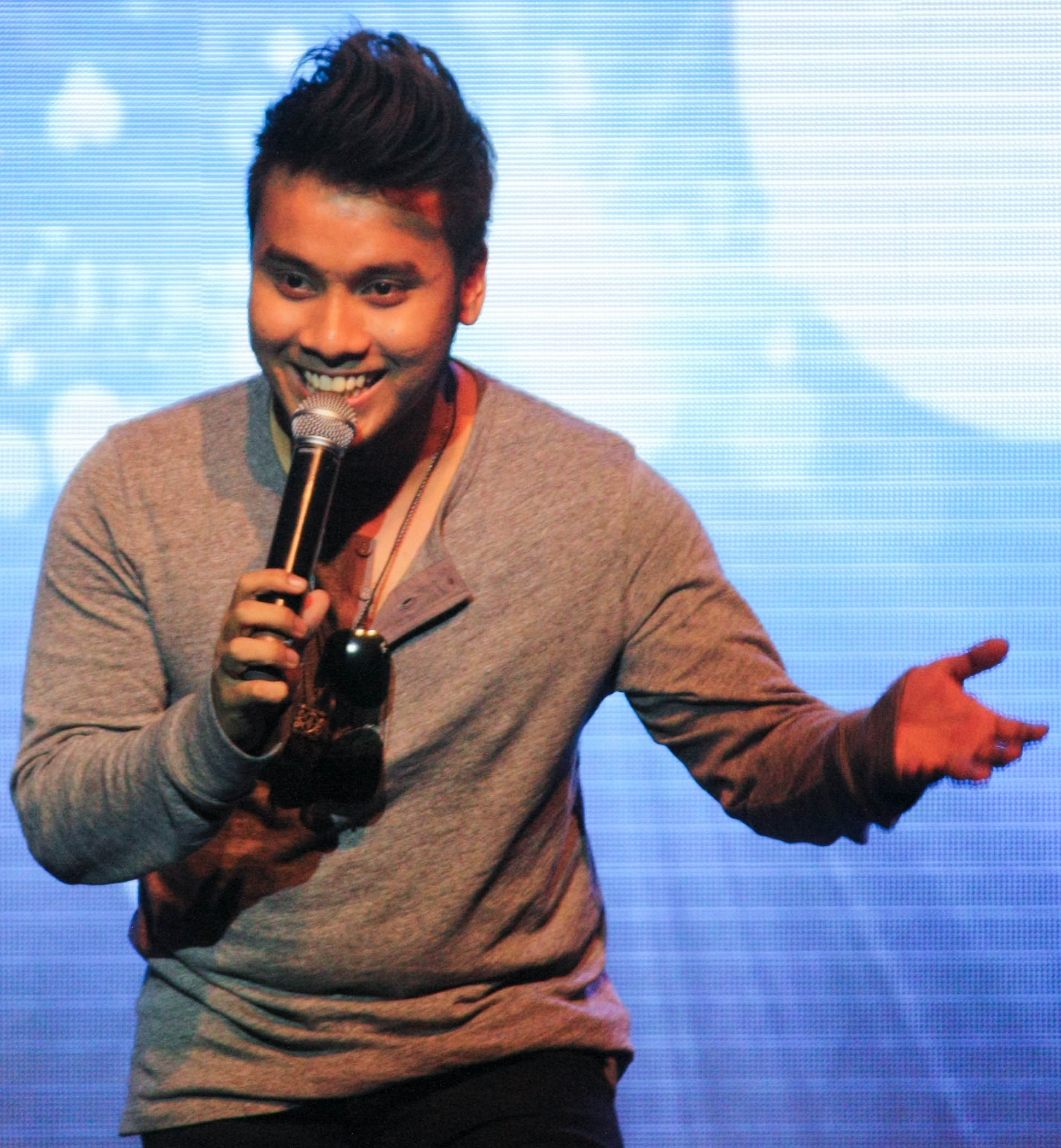
Singaporean Awi Rafael wrote the music for "Mula dan Akhir" which was included in Fragmen.

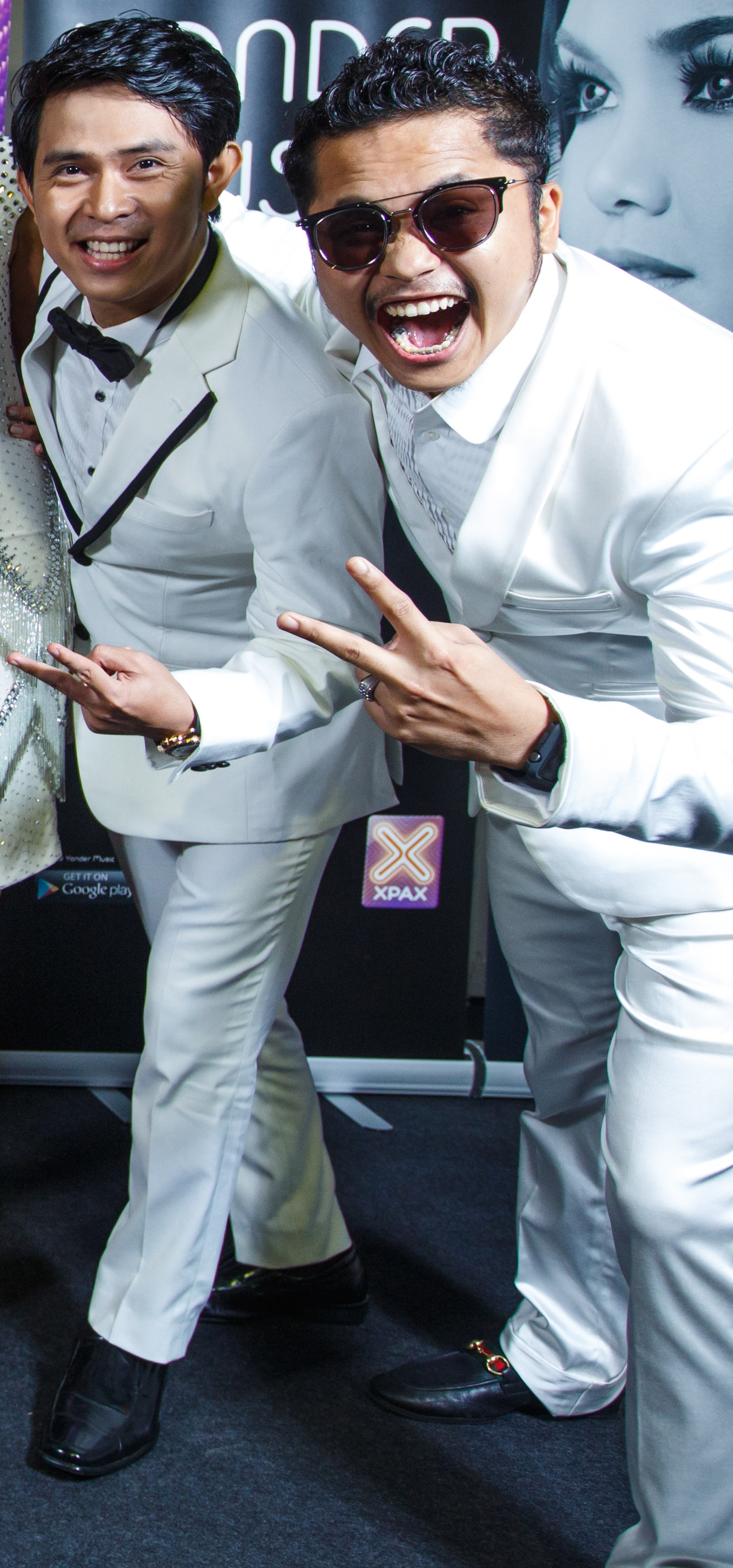
Indonesian singer Cakra Khan and Malaysian singer Hafiz Suip provided the vocals for duets "Seluruh Cinta" and "Muara Hati" respectively.

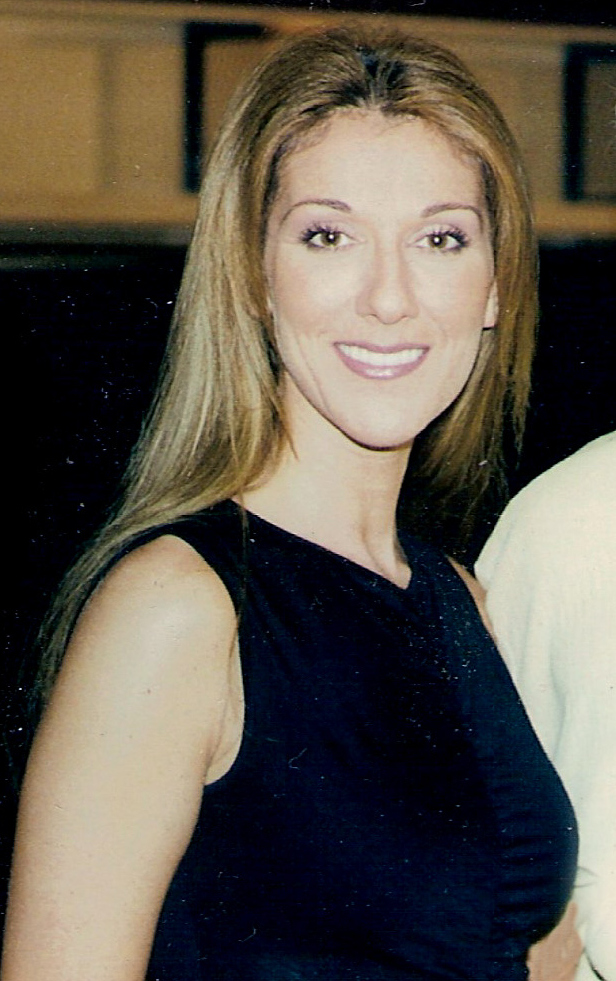
Siti has covered and recorded two songs that were previously released by Canadian singer Celine Dion, "Because You Loved Me" and "The Colour of My Love".

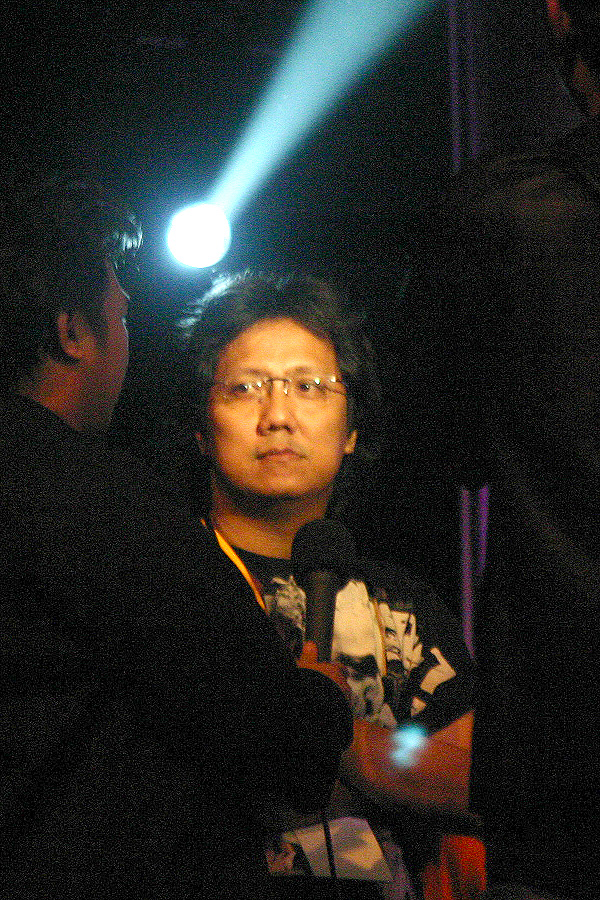
Indonesian composer Erwin Gutawa wrote the music for "Sejarah" and "Tanpa Dendam di Hati".

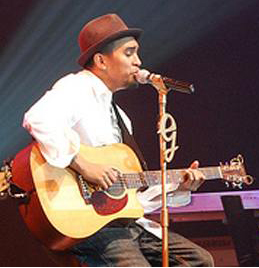
Indonesian singer Glenn Fredly wrote the lyrics and the music for "Bila Harus Memilih" which was included in Transkripsi.

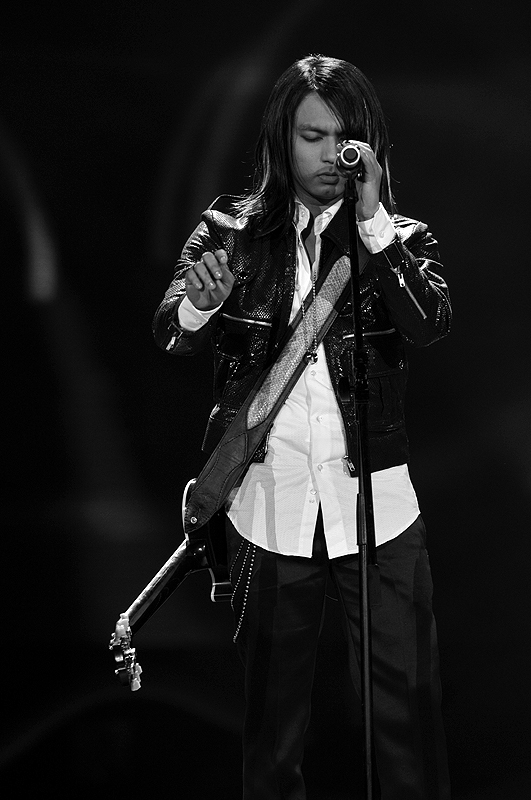
Malaysian singer Faizal Tahir has worked with Siti on several occasions, including providing the lyrics and music for "Aku" and as a duet partner on "Dirgahayu".

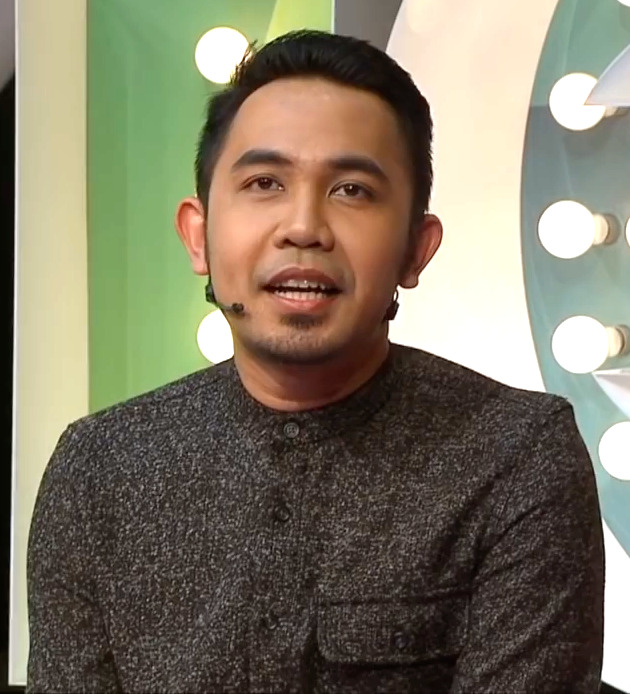
Malaysian singer Hafiz Hamidun composed "Basyirah", "Mikraj Cinta", and "Rencong".

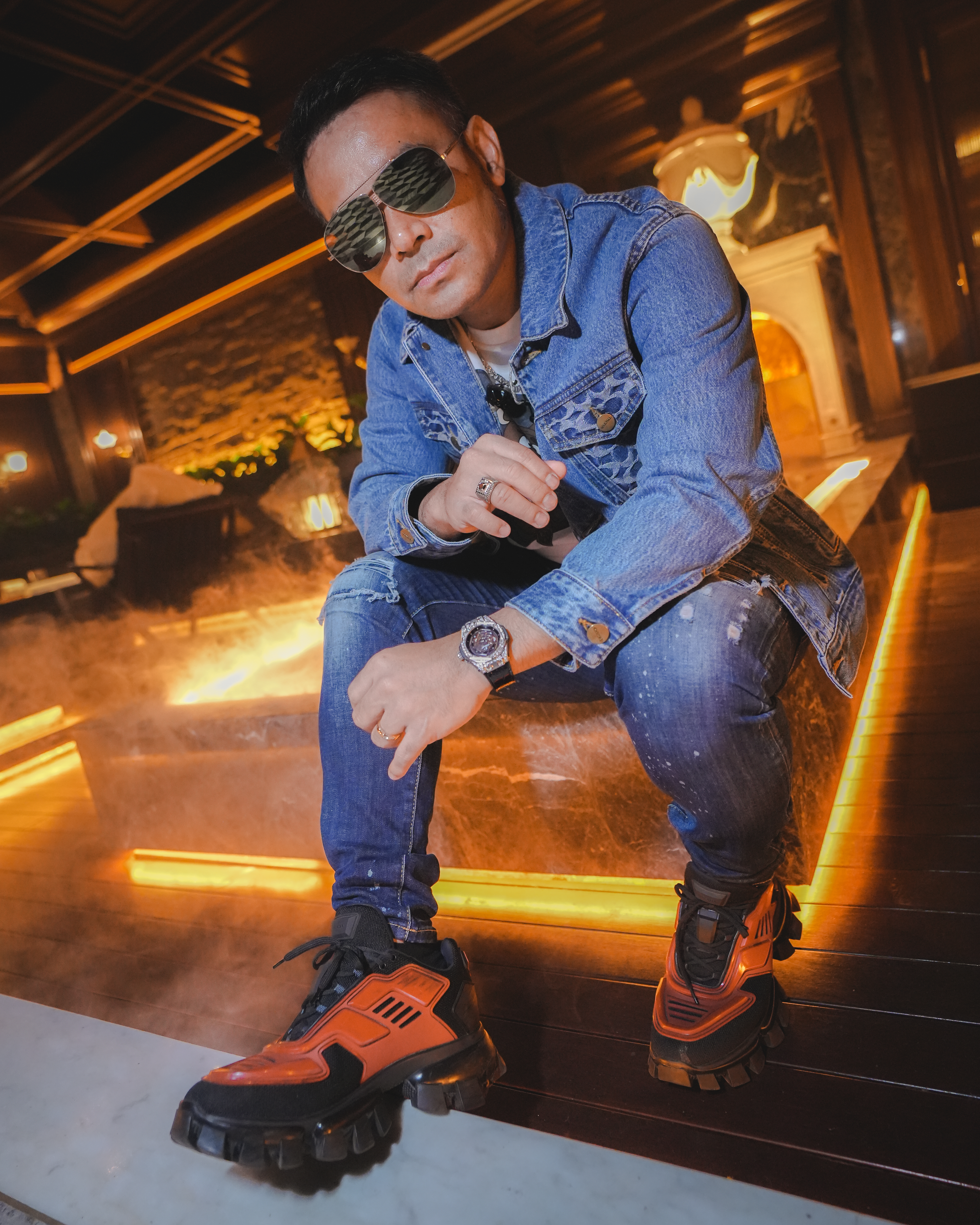
Indonesian singer Judika served as Siti's duet partner for "Kisah Ku Inginkan".

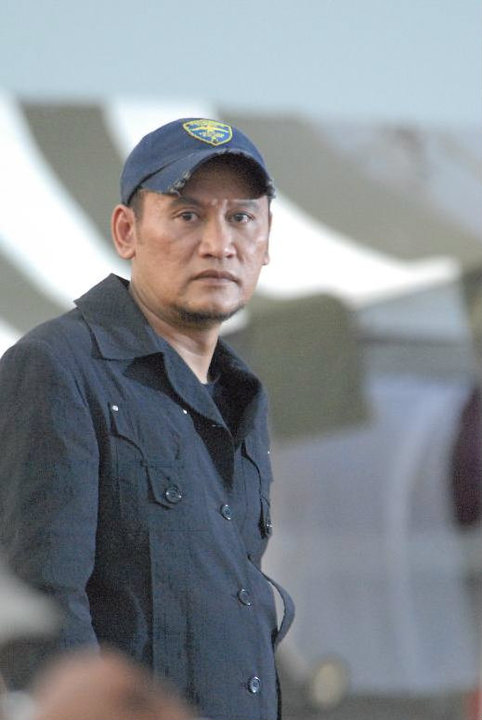
Indonesian composer Krishna Balagita composed the lyrics and music for "Seluruh Cinta".

Indonesian singer and composer Melly Goeslaw composed the music for "Biarlah Rahsia", "Jenjang Cinta", "Kuasa Cintamu", "Menyapa Dunia", and "Pastikan".

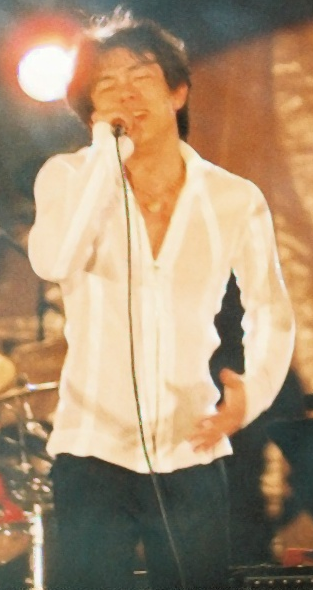
Japanese singer and composer Kazufumi Miyazawa composed the music for "Dunia Milik Kita".

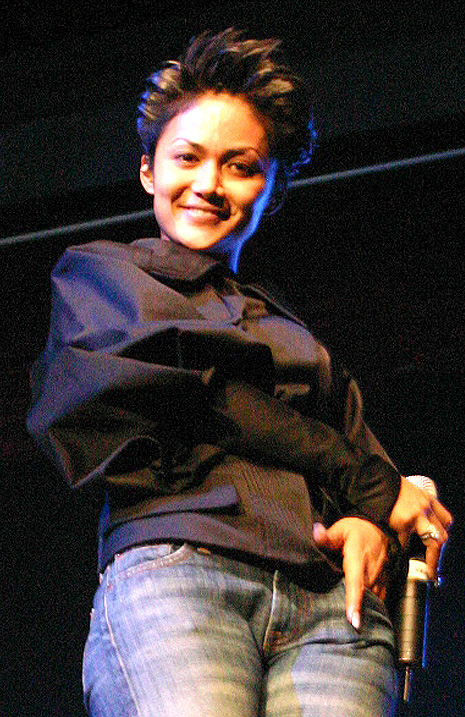
In 2009, Siti Nurhaliza recorded a six-track duet album, CTKD: Canda, Tangis, Ketawa, Duka with Indonesian singer Krisdayanti.

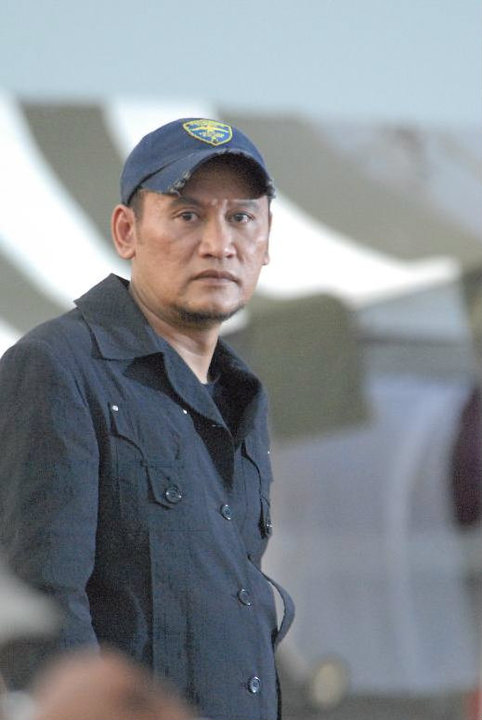
Indonesian composer Krishna Balagita composed the lyrics and music for "Seluruh Cinta".

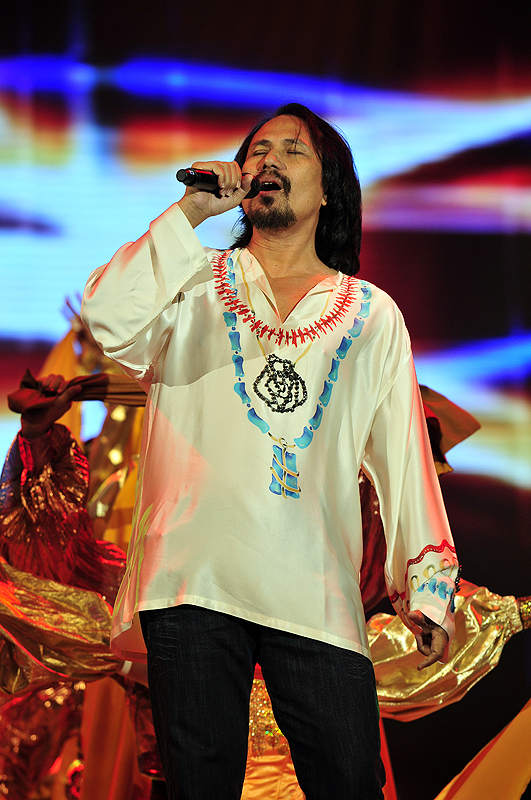
Singaporean M. Nasir wrote, produced, and provided the vocals for the duet "Bagaikan Sakti".

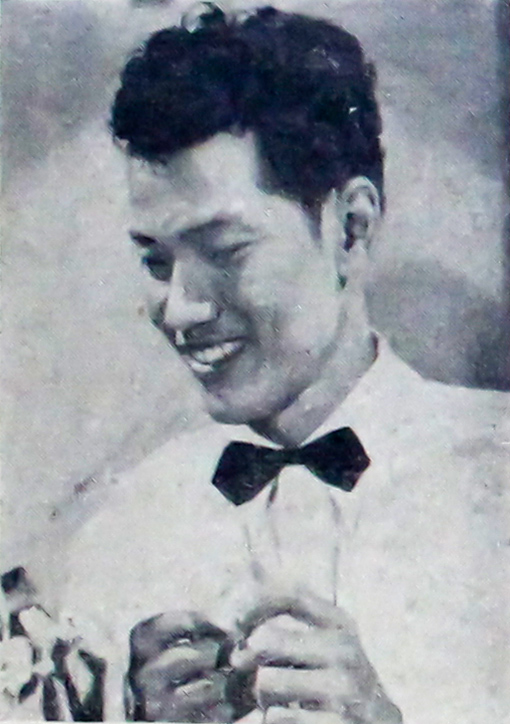
Regarded as a Malaysian film icon, Siti has covered and recorded three songs that were composed by P. Ramlee, "Alunan Biola", "Anakku Sayangku", and "Bunga Melor".

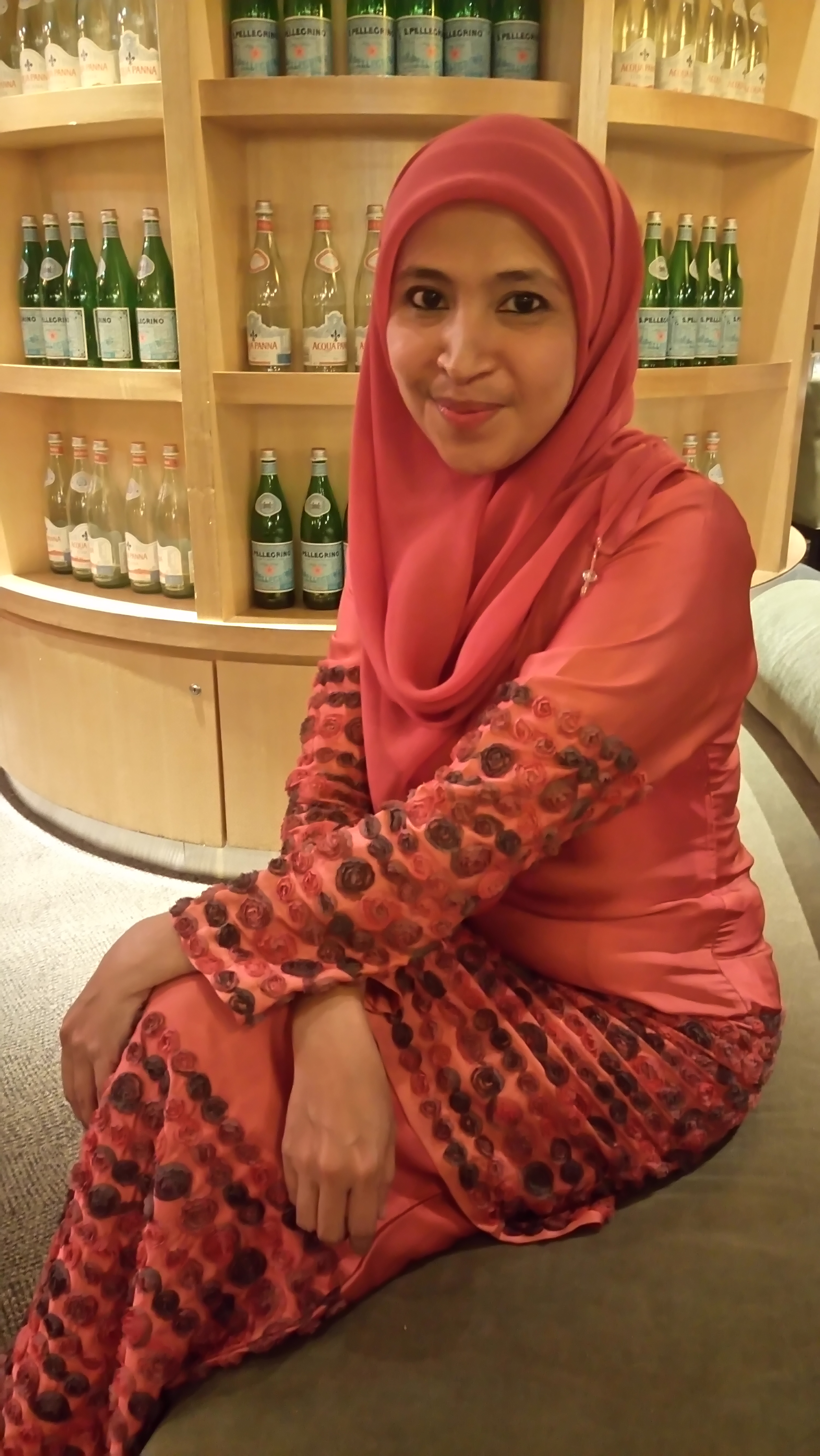
Rozi Abdul Razak (Rozi Sang Dewi) has written lyrics for several songs for Siti Nurhaliza including "Jaga Dia Untukku", "Menatap dalam Mimpi", and "Warna Dunia".

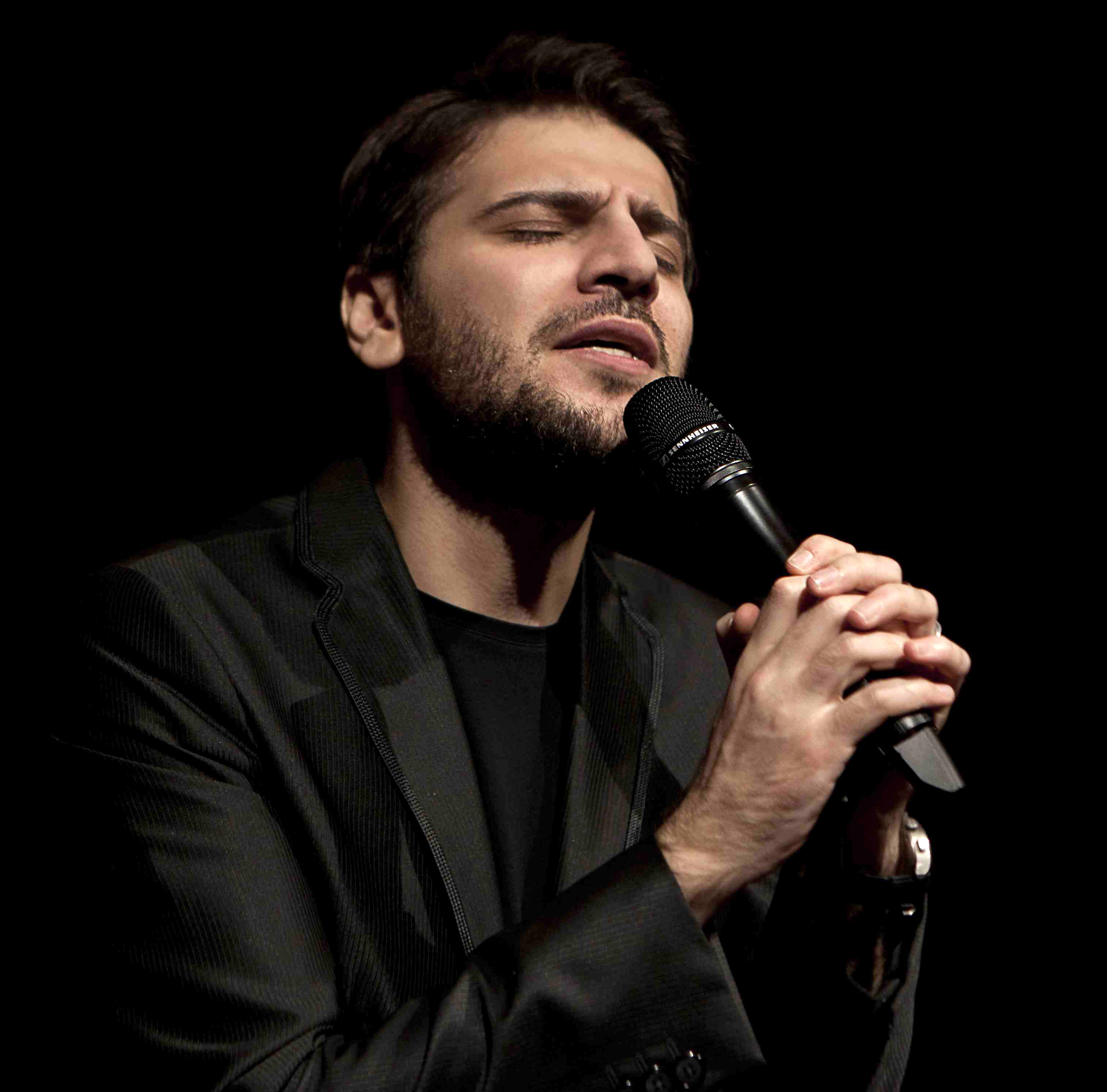
Siti Nurhaliza provided the guest vocals for "You Came to Me" which was included in British singer Sami Yusuf's Southeast Asian version of Salaam.

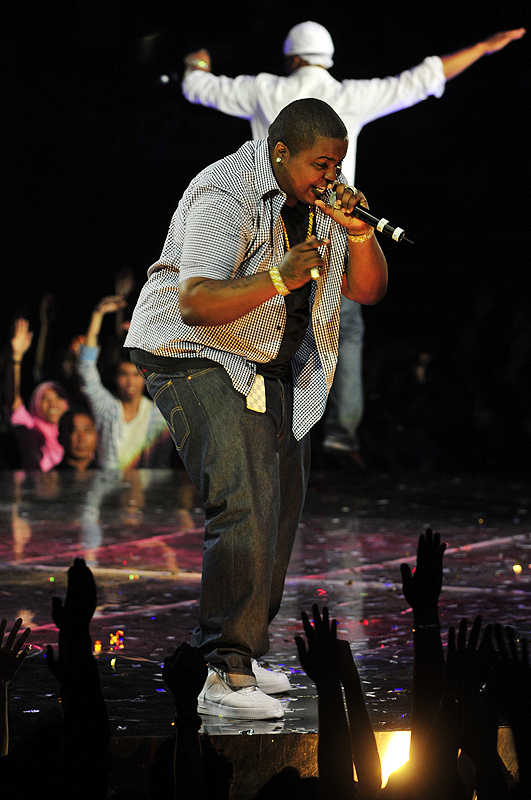
American rapper and singer Sean Kingston appears as a featured artist for "Remember You" which was included as the last track on All Your Love.

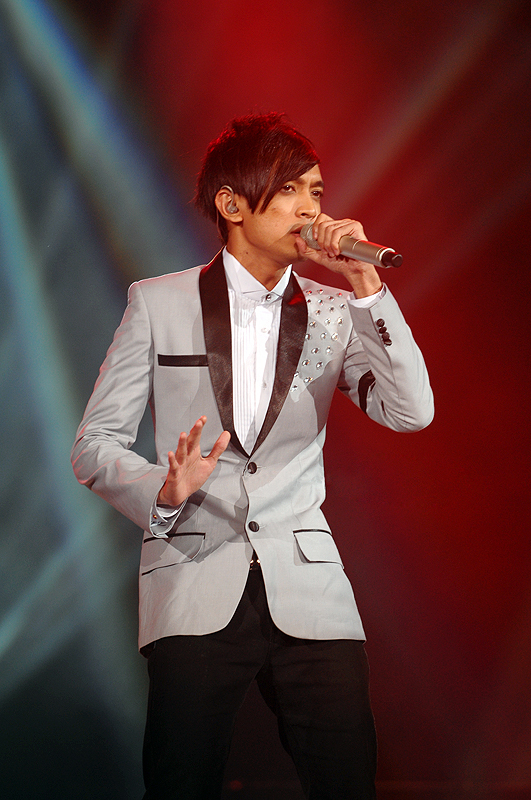
Malaysian singer Tomok composed the music for "Teratas".

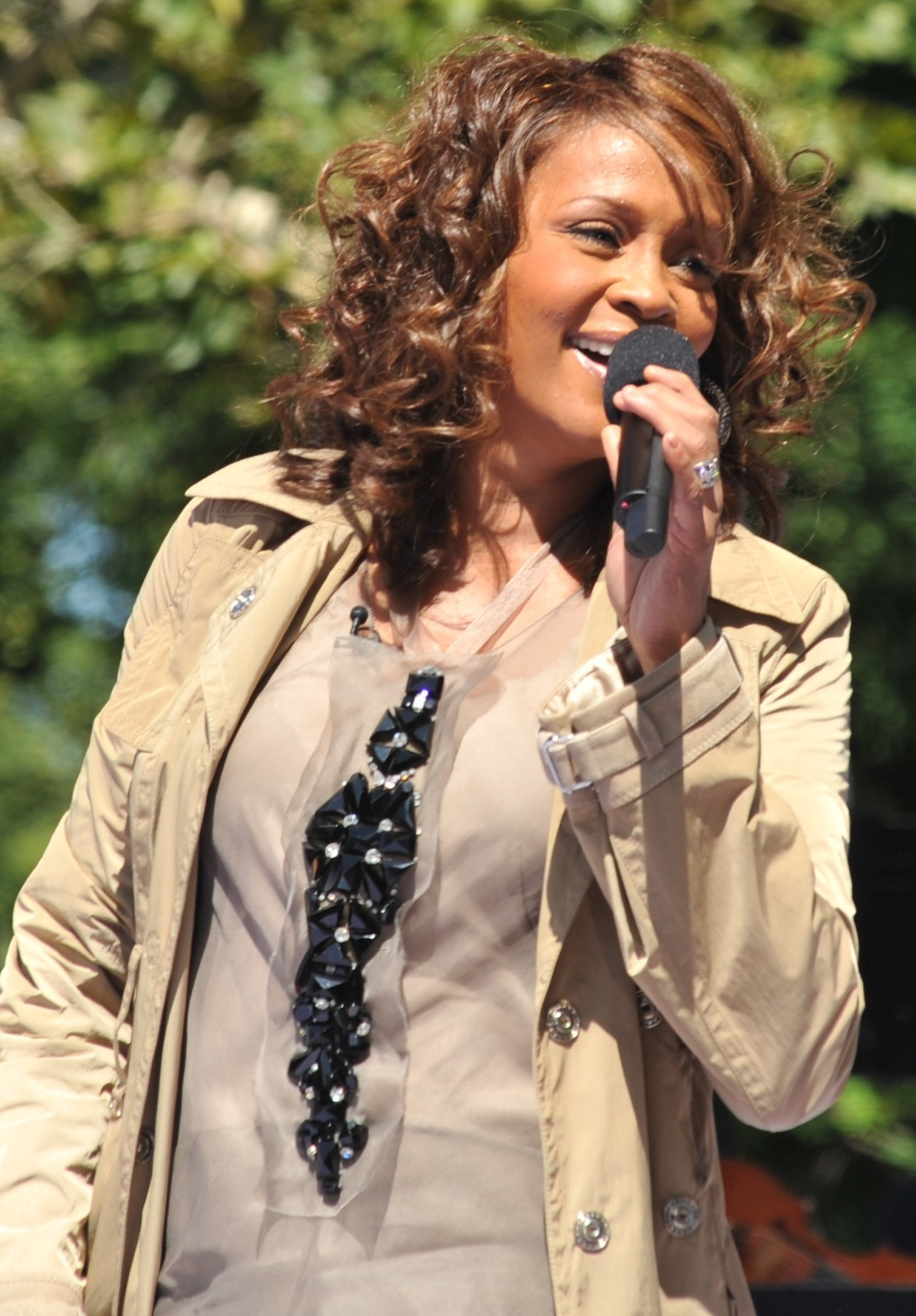
American singer Whitney Houston appeared posthumously in the 2016 version of "Memories".

Key
‡	Indicates lyrics or/and music written solely by Siti Nurhaliza
#	Indicates songs that are copyright controlled
±	Indicates live recording release
•	Indicates songs recorded in a language other than Malaysian and Indonesian
§	Indicates songs that are copyright controlled and recorded in a language other than Bahasa Malaysia and Indonesian

Name of song, lyrics writers/music writers, album, duration of song and year of release.
Song	Lyric writer(s)	Music writer(s)	Album	Length	Year	Ref.
"1 Malaysia" Duet with Atilia, Bob, Danell Lee, Reshmonu, Suki Low, and Zainal Abidin	Anuar Razak		Promotional single release	3:10	2011	
"7 Nasihat" ("7 Pieces of Advice") Duet with Kmy Kmo and Luca Sickta	Kmy Kmo; Luca Sickta		ManifestaSITI2020	3:39	2020	
"Ada Masa Mata" ("Sometimes with Eyes")	Ad Samad	M. Nasir	Lentera Timur	4:14	2008	
"Aidilfitri di Alaf Baru" ("Eid al-Fitr in the New Millennium") Duet with Noraniza Idris, Liza Hanim, Anis Suraya and New Boyz	Asmah Ismail	Khalil Shariff	Aidilfitri di Alaf Baru	4:16	2000	
"Airmata Ibu" ("A Mother's Tears")	Ad Samad; Tanty	Aiman	E.M.A.S	4:20	2003	
"Air Mata Syawal" (Note: "Air Mata Syawal" was included earlier in 2002 for Fiesta Aidilfitri, a special Eid al-Fitr compilation album by Suria Records.) ("Tears of Shawwal")	Nurul Asyiqin	Pak Ngah	Anugerah Aidilfitri	5:01	2003	
"Aktifkan Dirimu" (Note: Theme song when she was an ambassador for Hotlink Malaysia. It also has an English version, "Activate Yourself".) ("Activate Yourself") Duet with Reshmonu, Vince, and Zahid	Cham VE		Promotional single release	—N/a	2004	
"Aku" ("I")	Faizal Tahir; Mike Chan		Fragmen	3:42	2014	
"Aku Bidadari Syurgamu" ("I'm Your Heavenly Angel")	Siti Rosmizah	Ippo Hafiz	ManifestaSITI2020	3:54	2020	
"Aku Bukan Malaikat" ("I'm Not an Angel")	Dian	Opick	SimetriSiti	4:07	2017	
"Aku Cinta Padamu" ("I Love You")	Baiduri	L.Y.	Siti Nurhaliza II	5:23	1997	
"Alhamdullilah" ("Praise be to God") Atta Halilintar and Aurel Hermansyah featuring Siti Nurhaliza	Atta Halilintar; Freno A Djermor	Atta Halilintar; Freno A Djermor; Iskandar F	Promotional single release	4:17	2022	
"All Over Again" •	Bryan Bouro; Cristian Alexanda		All Your Love	3:26	2011	
"All Your Love" •	Cristian Alexanda		All Your Love	4:37	2011	
"Alunan Biola" ("The Tunes of the Violin")	S. Sudarmaji	P. Ramlee	Koleksi Orkestra RTM dalam Karya Warisan (Vol. 1)	4:36	—N/a	
"Amarah" ("Anger") Duet with Krisdayanti	Siti Nurhaliza ‡	Audi Mok	CTKD: Canda, Tangis, Ketawa, Duka	3:41	2009	
"Ampun Tuanku Duli Baginda" ("Forgive Me, Your Majesty")	Siso Kopratasa	Pak Ngah	Promotional single release	—N/a	2008	
"Anakanda" ("Son")	Rozi Sang Dewi	Siti Nurhaliza ‡	Legasi	3:45	2021	
"Anak Raja Turun Beradu" # ("The King's Child Has Come to Sleep")	Copyright Control		Koleksi Orkestra RTM dalam Karya Warisan (Vol. 1)	3:41	—N/a	
"Anakku Sayangku" ("My Child, My Love")	S. Sudarmaji; Rozi Sang Dewi	P. Ramlee	Legasi	3:40	2021	
"Antara Waktu dan Usia" ("Between Time and Age")	Hani M.J.	Adnan Abu Hassan	Siti Nurhaliza I	5:18	1996	
"Anta Permana" ("Infinity")	Ezra Kong; Hael Husaini		ManifestaSITI2020	3:24	2020	
"Anugerah Aidilfitri" ("The Gift of Eid al-Fitr")	Ce'Kem	Pak Ngah	Anugerah Aidilfitri	3:50	2003	
"Ask For More" (Note: She recorded the song as a jingle in 2000 when she was the ambassador for Pepsi Malaysia.)	—N/a	—N/a	Promotional single release	—N/a	2000	
"Asma Ul Husna" ("Beautiful Names") •	—N/a	Eirma Fatima	Tahajjud Cinta	6:00	2009	
"Astana Jiwa" ("Palace of Souls")	Faizal SA Shahab; Rozie Rashid	Audi Mok	Promotional single release	3:35	2011	
"Azimat Cinta" ("Amulet of Love")	Hazida	Adnan Abu Hassan	Safa	4:57	2001	
"Badarsila" (Note: A type of soft white cloth.)	Lokgha	Suflan Faidzal	Sanggar Mustika	4:24	2002	
"Bagaikan Sakti" ("Like Magic")	M. Nasir		Puteri Gunung Ledang (Soundtrack)	5:04	2004	
"Balqis" ("Queen of Sheba")	Hairul Anuar Harun	Pak Ngah	Sahmura	4:38	2000	
"Basyirah" ("Good Tidings")	Fedtri Yahya	Hafiz Hamidun	ManifestaSITI2020	3:30	2020	
"Batasku Asaku" ("My Limit is My Hope")	Attan Hardilas	Siti Nurhaliza ‡	Tahajjud Cinta	4:10	2009	
"Be Like Water" (像水一樣) • Duet with Firdhaus Farmizi	Firdhaus Farmizi		Promotional single release	3:08	2026	
"Because You Loved Me" (Note: "Because You Loved Me" was included earlier in 2005 for My Samsung My World, a special compilation album by Samsung Malaysia.) •	Diane Warren		Siti & Friends	4:31	2010	
"Beradu di Khayalan" ("Sleeping in the Imagination")	Tisya	Aubrey Suwito	Safa	4:03	2001	
"Beraya dengan Saya" ("Eid al-Fitr with Me")	Iqie Hugh; Omar K Siti Nurhaliza		Promotional single release	3:21	2026	
"Bergending Dang Gong" (Note: Onomatopoeia for the sounds made by a Gong.) S.M. Salim featuring Siti Nurhaliza	Siso Kopratasa	Pak Ngah	Sekarang Dah Jadi.....	5:13	2003	
"Berpantun Kasih" ("Reciting Pantun of Love")	Siso Kopratasa	S. Atan	Sahmura	4:43	2000	
"Bersandar Cinta" ("Out of Love")	Ad Samad	Aubrey Suwito	SimetriSiti	3:58	2017	
"Betapa Ku Cinta Padamu" (Note: "Betapa Ku Cinta Padamu" is the Indonesian version of "Aku Cinta Padamu".) ("How Much I Love You") •	Baiduri; Yusak	L.Y.	Siti Nurhaliza II	6:00	1997	
"Biarkan" ("Let It Be")	Azalea	Azlan Abu Hassan	Hadiah Daripada Hati	3:50	2007	
"Biarlah Rahsia" ("Let It Be a Secret")	Siti Nurhaliza ‡	Melly Goeslaw	Transkripsi	4:09	2006	
"Bicara Luka" ("Hurtful Words")	Amran Omar	Fauzi Marzuki	Siti Nurhaliza I	5:01	1996	
"Bicara Manis Menghiris Kalbu" ("Heart-Breaking Sweet Words")	Lukhman S	Aiman	Safa	4:38	2001	
"Bila Hari Raya Menjelma" (Note: "Bila Hari Raya Menjelma" was included earlier in 2001 for Salam Aidilfitri, a special Eid al-Fitr compilation album by Suria Records.) ("When Eid al-Fitr is Here")	Nurul Asyiqin	S. Atan	Anugerah Aidilfitri	4:41	2003	
"Bila Harus Memilih" ("When One Should Choose")	Glenn Fredly		Transkripsi	4:23	2006	
"Bintang Kecil" # ("Little Stars")	Copyright Control; Rozi Sang Dewi	Copyright Control	Legasi	3:21	2021	
"Bintang Malam" ("The Star of the Night")	Katon Bagaskara		Lentera Timur	4:41	2008	
"Bisakah" ("Could")	Tessh R S	Aubrey Suwito	Transkripsi	4:39	2006	
"Bisikan Asmara" ("Whisper of Romance")	Amran Omar	Helen Yap	Siti Nurhaliza II	4:53	1997	
"Bisikan Hati" ("Whisper of the Heart")	Haimon Abd. Rahman		Sanggar Mustika	4:11	2002	
"Budi Bahasa Budaya Kita" ("Good Manners are Our Culture")	Habsah Hassan	Pak Ngah	Promotional single release	3:11	2005	
"Bukan Cinta Biasa" ("Not An Ordinary Love")	Dewiq; Siti Nurhaliza		E.M.A.S	4:23	2003	
"Bulan Kedamaian" ("A Month of Peace")	Yasin Sulaiman		Promotional single release	4:18	2007	
"Bulan Yang Mesra" ("A Friendly Moon")	Zubir Ali	Khairil Johari Johar	Lentera Timur	5:09	2008	
"Bunga Melor" ("Jasmine")	S. Sudarmaji	P. Ramlee	Sanggar Mustika	3:49	2002	
"Burung Kakak Tua" # ("Cockatoo")	Copyright Control; Rozi Sang Dewi	Copyright Control	Legasi	4:04	2021	
"Cahaya Cinta" ("The Light of Love")	Siti Nurhaliza ‡		Cerita Cinta	3:44	2006	
"Cahaya Seribu Liku" ("A Light with a Winding Course")	Siti Nurhaliza; Tanty	Andy Flop Poppy	Prasasti Seni	4:19	2004	
"Canggai" (Note: A type of nail accessory that is commonly made of gold or silver.)	Tok Wan	Rosli Selasih	Sahmura	4:45	2000	
"Cari-Cari" ("Looking")	Shahnaz	Fauzi Marzuki	Siti Nurhaliza I	4:22	1996	
"Cenderamaya" ("Boundless Extraordinary Gift")	Amni Musfirah; Irena Taib; Jamilah Abu Bakar		Gema Bumantara	3:07	2025	
"Cindai" (Note: A type of textile.)	Hairul Anuar Harun	Pak Ngah	Cindai	4:52	1997	
"Cinta Ini" ("This Love")	Amran Omar	Johan Nawawi	Lentera Timur	3:50	2008	
"Cinta Tak Berganti" ("Irreplaceable Love")	Siti Nurhaliza ‡	Iman Wan	Prasasti Seni	4:43	2004	
"Cinta Tanpa Sempadan" ("A Love without Borders") Siti Nurhaliza featuring Nurul Zahid	Buddhi Hekayat	Helen Yap	Promotional single release	4:33	2012	
"Cintai Kraf Malaysia" ("Love Malaysian Craft"	Siso Kopratasa	Pak Ngah	Promotional single release	3:43	2003	
"Cintamu" ("Your Love")	Fedtri Yahya	Sharon Paul	Hadiah Daripada Hati	4:47	2007	
"Citra Budaya" ("Cultural Image") ±	Ajuna Sukma	Muslih Sang Saka	Konsert Lentera Timur	5:35	2014	
"Cuba Untuk Mengerti" ("Try to Understand")	Tengku Shafick		Transkripsi	4:45	2006	
"Cuti-Cuti Malaysia" ("Holidays in Malaysia")	Mesran M.Y.	Dato' Ahmad Nawab Khan	Cuti-Cuti Malaysia	4:06	2002	
"Comel Pipi Merah" (Note: The standalone single version of "Comel Pipi Merah" was first released in 2018 before the inclusion of the remastered version three years later in Legasi, an album featuring a compilation of classic Malaysian children's songs by Siti Nurhaliza.) ("Adorable Rosy Cheeks")	Rozi Sang Dewi	Siti Nurhaliza ‡	Legasi	3:53	2021	
"Dalam Diamku" ("In My Silent") Duet with Krisdayanti	Krisdayanti; Riznadianka	Audi Mok	CTKD: Canda, Tangis, Ketawa, Duka	4:17	2009	
"Dalam Taman Syahdu" ("In a Peaceful Garden")	Yaries	Johari Teh	The Best of Siti Nurhaliza	4:45	2000	
"Damak" # ("Darts")	Copyright Control		Cindai	4:28	1997	
"Debaran Cinta" ("Palpitation of Love")	Faridah A. Razak; Siti Nurhaliza	Zuraini	E.M.A.S	3:40	2003	
"Demi Kasih Kita" ("For the Sake of Our Love")	Siti Nurhaliza ‡	Adnan Abu Hassan	Siti Nurhaliza II	4:47	1997	
"Demi Kasih Sayang" ("For the Sake of Love")	Baiduri	L.Y.	Adiwarna	4:02	1998	
"Destinasi Cinta" ("Love Destination")	PSNN	Lin Li Zhen	Transkripsi	3:24	2006	
"Di Batas Masa" ("At the Threshold of Time")	Habsah Hassan	Naim	Sanggar Mustika	5:40	2002	
"Di Kayangan Kita" ("In Our Paradise")	Keon	Johari Teh	Lentera Timur	4:20	2008	
"Di Sini Ku Berjanji" ("Here I Promise")	Azmeer; Senibayan	Azmeer	E.M.A.S	4:46	2003	
"Di Taman Teman" ("In the Companion's Garden")	Hairul Anuar Harun	Fauzi Marzuki	Lentera Timur	4:48	2008	
"Di Ujung Hari" ("At the End of the Day") Ungu featuring Siti Nurhaliza	Arlonsy Miraldi		Promotional single release	4:10	2023	
"Dialah di Hati" ("He's in My Heart")	Habsah Hassan	Aidit Alfian	Prasasti Seni	4:21	2004	
"Diari Hatimu" ("The Diary of Your Heart")	Ferdi Khalid NS		Adiwarna	6:00	1998	
"Dirgahayu" ("Perpetuity") Duet with Faizal Tahir	Faizal Tahir; Mike Chan; Ezra Kong		Dirgahayu – Single	3:29	2016	
"Don't Put My Heart on Hold" (Note: "Don't Put My Heart on Hold" is the English version of "Beradu di Khayalan".) •	Aubrey Suwito		The Malaysia Book of Records – Most Awards Won Artiste	4:03	2001	
"Dondang Dendang" ("Singing a Happy Song") Duet with Noraniza Idris	Hairul Anuar Harun	Pak Ngah	Seri Balas	6:11	1999	
"Dua Dunia" ("Two Worlds") Too Phat featuring Siti Nurhaliza	Malique; Joe Flizzow	D'Navigator; Malique; Joe Flizzow; Lah of V.E	Rebirth Into Reality	4:16	2005	
"Dunia Milik Kita" ("The World is Ours")	Hani M.J.	Kazufumi Miyazawa	J-ASEAN POPs – Official Theme Song	3:42	2003	
"Engkau" ("You")	Ade Govinda		Unplugged	4:37	2015	
"Engkau Bagaikan Permata" ("You are Like a Jewel")	Sham Amir Hussain; Siti Nurhaliza	Helen Yap	Pancawarna	5:06	1999	
"Es Lilin" # ("Popsicles")	Copyright Control		Cindai	3:56	1997	
"Falling in Love" •	Bryan Bouro; Cristian Alexanda		All Your Love	3:02	2011	
"Fight for Love" •	Bryan Bouro; Cristian Alexanda		All Your Love	4:15	2011	
"Galau" ("Perplexed")	Cacaq	Cacaq; Mujahid Abdul Wahab	Galau – Single	4:48	2012	
"Ganti" ("Replacement") Siti Nurhaliza featuring Nao Zumar	Amir Hasan; Nuha Nik	Nuha Nik; Mingaling	Sitism	3:24	2023	
"Gelora Asmara" ("The Turbulent of Romance")	Hazida	Adnan Abu Hassan	Adiwarna	4:18	1998	
"Gelora Kasih" ("The Turbulent of Love")	Lukhman S	Fauzi Marzuki	The Best of Siti Nurhaliza	5:23	2000	
"Gubahanku" # ("My Arrangement") 2 By 2 featuring Siti Nurhaliza	Copyright Control		Pak Pung Pak Mustafe	4:19	1997	
"Hanya Dia" ("Only Him") Duet with Krisdayanti	Pacha Andrian	Aubrey Suwito	CTKD: Canda, Tangis, Ketawa, Duka	5:20	2009	
"Hanya Dirimu" ("Only You")	Hani M.J.	Ajai	Prasasti Seni	4:31	2004	
"Hanya Semalam" ("Only for a Night") (Note: The song was only performed once during Siti and M. Nasir's co-headlining concert in Singapore, Bagaikan Sakti concert.) Duet with M. Nasir ±	Siti Nurhaliza ‡	M. Nasir	Promotional single release	—N/a	2010	
"Harapan Tanpa Suara" (Note: "Harapan Tanpa Suara" is a promotional theme song to stop child abuse by Utusan Malaysia. Artists involved are including Adibah Noor, Aishah, Aizat Amdan, Alyah, Amy Mastura, Anuar Zain, Anita Sarawak, Erra Fazira, Lah Ahmad, Mawi, Maya Karin, Misha Omar, and many others.) ("A Hope without a Voice") Siti Nurhaliza was part of "Kempen Kami Prihatin"	Habsah Hassan	S. Atan	Promotional single release	—N/a	2010	
"Hari Kemenangan" ("The Day of Victory")	Siso Kopratasa	Pak Ngah	Hari Kemenangan – Single	4:20	2016	
"Hati" ("Heart")	Shuhaimi Baba	Sharon Paul	Hadiah Daripada Hati	4:19	2007	
"Hati Berbisik" ("Whispering Heart")	Siti Nurhaliza ‡	Siti Nurhaliza; Aubrey Suwito	Transkripsi	4:10	2006	
"Hati Kama" ("Heart in Love") Duet with Noraniza Idris	Hairul Anuar Harun	Pak Ngah	Seri Balas	5:08	1999	
"Hati Yang Rindu" ("The Longing Heart")	Usop Kopratasa		Gema Bumantara	4:24	2025	
"Hiasi Duniaku" ("Decorate My World")	Sid Murshid		SimetriSiti	4:10	2017	
"Hidup Penuh Bicara" ("Life is Full of Words")	Eena Houzyama; Yasin Sulaiman	Yasin Sulaiman	Transkripsi	3:59	2006	
"Hujung Bumi" ("The World's Edge")	Affan Mazlan; Danish Norr		Gema Bumantara	3:06	2025	
"I'll Wait Forever" • Siti Nurhaliza featuring Cristian Alexanda	Bryan Bouro; Cristian Alexanda		All Your Love	4:23	2011	
"Ikhlas" ("Sincere") Duet with Nissa Sabyan and Taufik Batisah	John Jeevansingham; Ikhwan Fatanna; Omar K		Promotional single release	4:00	2019	
"Ikrar Cinta" ("Love Vow")	Sulu Sarawak	Amirah Ali	SimetriSiti	3:48	2017	
"Impiankan Nyata" ("Dreams Realized")	Rauf	Abdul Rahim Bachik; Rauf; Firdaus Mahmud	Transkripsi	4:04	2006	
"Indah Percintaan" ("The Beauty of Being in Love")	M. Zulkifli	Nyzar	Safa	5:45	2001	
"Intrig Cinta" ("The Intrigue of Love")	Siti Nurhaliza ‡	Loloq	Transkripsi	4:04	2006	
"I Cry Out" •	Bryan Bouro; Cristian Alexanda		All Your Love	4:51	2011	
"Jaga Dia Untukku" ("Take Care of Him for Me")	Rozi Sang Dewi	Aubrey Suwito	Fragmen	3:24	2014	
"Jalanan Berduri" ("Thorny Paths")	Hani M.J.	Peter Fam	Siti Nurhaliza I	5:38	1996	
"Jalinan Cinta" ("A Love Relationship")	Siti Nurhaliza; Haslan	Helen Yap	Safa	3:54	2001	
"Jangan Ditanya" # ("Don't Ask")	Copyright Control		Klasik	3:18	2007	
"Janji" # ("Promise")	Copyright Control		Cindai	3:17	1997	
"Janji Kasih" ("The Promise of Love")	Siti Nurhaliza ‡	Aidit Alfian	E.M.A.S	5:00	2003	
"Jawapan di Persimpangan" ("An Answer at the Crossroads")	Othman Zainuddin	Adnan Abu Hassan	Siti Nurhaliza I	4:21	1996	
"Jelmakanlah Ayumu" ("Display Your Beauty")	Siso Kopratasa	Pak Ngah	Lentera Timur	4:39	2008	
"Jenjang Cinta" ("The Wedding Dais of Love")	Melly Goeslaw; Siti Nurhaliza	Melly Goeslaw	Gema Bumantara	3:33	2025	
"Jerat Percintaan" ("Love Trap")	Othman Zainuddin; Hani M.J.	Adnan Abu Hassan	Siti Nurhaliza I	4:55	1996	
"Jika Kau Tak Datang" ("If You Are Not Coming") Duet with Krisdayanti	Krisdayanti; Riznadianka	Audi Mok	CTKD: Canda, Tangis, Ketawa, Duka	3:43	2009	
"Joget Berhibur" ("Joget to Entertain")	Syed Indera Syed Omar (Siso Kopratasa)	Rahim Jantan	Cindai	4:35	1997	
"Joget Kasih Tak Sudah" ("Joget of Unrequited Love")	Nurul Asyiqin	S. Atan	Sahmura	5:03	2000	
"Joget Menanti Kasih" ("Joget of Awaiting for Love")	Habsah Hassan	S. Atan	Lentera Timur	3:16	2008	
"Joget Pahang" # ("Joget of Pahang")	Copyright Control		Cindai	3:51	1997	
"Joget Senyum Memikat" ("Joget of Enticing Smile")	Nurul Asyiqin	S. Atan	Sanggar Mustika	4:28	2002	
"Kaca dan Permata" ("Glass and Gemstones") Duet with Umairah	Omar K Shazriq Azeman		Gema Bumantara	3:51	2025	
"Kalau Berkasih" ("If in Love") Duet with Awie	Glow Rush; Tam Cobain; Mike Chan		Sitism	3:36	2023	
"Kaparinyo" # ("How Is It")	Copyright Control		Cindai	4:20	1997	
"Kasihku Selamanya" ("My Love is Forever")	Ad Samad	Aubrey Suwito	ManifestaSITI2020	4:24	2020	
"Kau Ilhamku" (Note: "Kau Ilhamku" is a promotional single by various Malaysian and Indonesian artists. Artists involved are including Afgansyah Reza, Ariel Noah, Cita Citata, Elizabeth Tan, Jaclyn Victor, Joe Flizzow, Man Bai, Natasha Ines, SonaOne, and Yuna.) ("You're My Inspiration") Siti Nurhaliza was part of Yonder Music All-Stars	—N/a	J-Key; Russel Curtis	Yonder Music All-Stars – Kau Ilhamku	4:52	2015	
"Kau Kekasihku" ("You're My Lover")	Alam Maya	Ajai	Pancawarna	5:21	1999	
"Kau Ku Sayang" ("You Are That I Love")	Pot		Safa	3:16	2001	
"Kau Sangat Bererti" ("You're Really Meaningful")	Hamid Mufari		Fragmen	4:20	2014	
"Kau Takdirku" ("You're My Destiny")	Habsah Hassan	Mohariz Yakup	SimetriSiti	3:59	2017	
"Kedamaian" ("Peace")	Hani M.J.	Mark Wong	Pancawarna	4:50	1999	
"Kembalikan Indah" ("Bring Back the Beauty")	Siti Nurhaliza; Slen	Helen Yap	Prasasti Seni	4:58	2004	
"Kerana Dirimu" ("Because of You")	Cynthia Lamusu		Hadiah Daripada Hati	5:28	2007	
"Kerana Jelingan Mu" ("Because of Your Glances")	Lukman S	Adnan Abu Hassan	Siti Nurhaliza I	3:51	1996	
"Keroncong Si Endang Endong" ("Endang Endong's Kroncong")	Raja Kobat		Sahmura	5:28	2000	
"Kesilapanku, Keegoanmu" ("My Fault, Your Ego")	Baiduri	L.Y.	Siti Nurhaliza II	5:25	1997	
"Kesuma" ("Beautiful Woman")	Aisha Retno	Aisha Retno; Radi	Gema Bumantara	3:51	2025	
"Ketawa Lagi" # ("Laugh Again") Duet with Noraniza Idris	Copyright Control		Seri Balas	5:21	1999	
"Ketika Cinta" ("When Love")	Opick		Tahajjud Cinta	4:03	2009	
"Khayalan Cinta" ("The Fantasy of Love")	Ucu	Xiao Wong	Siti Nurhaliza II	5:09	1997	
"Kini Dikau Jauh" ("Now You're Far Away") Duet with Saida, Saerah, Ayie and Ali	Ad Samad	Aidit Alfian	Apresiasi	5:25	2010	
"Kini Kau Disisi" ("Now You're By My Side")	Hani M.J.	Helen Yap	Molek	4:36	1998	
"Kisah Ku Inginkan" ("The Story that I Want") Duet with Judika	Ivan Lahardika		SimetriSiti	4:28	2017	
"Kita Kan Bersama" ("We Will Be Together")	Sham Amir Hussain	Malek Osman	Adiwarna	3:50	1998	
"Kota Seniman" ("City of Artists")	Hairul Anuar Harun	Ayob Ibrahim	Di Sini Semaraknya Seni - Kota Seniman	4:22	2006	
"Ku Mahu" ("I Want")	Rina Khan	Audi Mok	Hadiah Daripada Hati	3:13	2007	
"Ku Menunggu" ("I'll Be Waiting")	Habsah Hassan	Aidit Alfian	Prasasti Seni	4:58	2004	
"Ku Milikmu" ("I'm Yours")	M. Zulkifli; Siti Nurhaliza	Zuraini	E.M.A.S	3:36	2003	
"Ku Percaya Ada Cinta" ("I Believe There is Love")	Habsah Hassan	Audi Mok	Tahajjud Cinta	4:36	2009	
"Ku Yakini" ("I'm Confident")	Siti Nurhaliza ‡	Helen Yap	E.M.A.S	4:58	2003	
"Kuasa Cintamu" ("The Power of Your Love")	Melly Goeslaw	Melly Goeslaw; Siti Nurhaliza	ManifestaSITI2020	4:06	2020	
"Kudus Sinarmu" ("The Holiness of Your Light")	Ce'Kem	Pak Ngah	Safa	5:23	2001	
"Kumbang Bunga" ("Beetle (and) Flower") Duet with Lesti	Firdaus Rahmat; Iqie Hugh		Gema Bumantara	3:29	2025	
"Kurik Kundi" (Note: Spotted Adenanthera seeds.)	Nurul Asyiqin	Pak Ngah	Sanggar Mustika	5:49	2002	
"Kurniaan Dalam Samaran" ("A Blessing in Disguise")	S. Amin Shahab	Ross Ariffin	Pancawarna	4:18	1999	
"Kusedari" ("I Aware")	Habsah Hassan	Siti Nurhaliza ‡	Sitism	4:02	2023	
"Lagu Gembira" # ("The Happy Song") 2 By 2 featuring Siti Nurhaliza	Copyright Control		Rindu	3:06	1996	
"Lagu Ku di Hati Mu" ("My Song in Your Heart")	Siti Nurhaliza ‡	Salman	Adiwarna	4:32	1998	
"Lagu Rindu" ("The Song of Pining")	Yasin		Prasasti Seni	4:30	2004	
"Lakaran Kehidupan" ("Sketches of Life")	Siti Nurhaliza ‡	Mat SW	Safa	3:40	2001	
"Laksmana Mati Dibunuh" # ("The Admiral was Murdered")	Copyright Control		Cindai	5:20	1997	
"Langkah di Persada" ("Marching in the Homeland")	Tisya	Rickie Koes	Pancawarna	4:33	1999	
"Lebih Indah" ("More Meaningful")	Ad Samad	Aubrey Suwito	Fragmen	3:55	2014	
"Lelaki (Warkah Seorang Anak)" ("Man (A Daughter's Memoir)")	Habsah Hassan	Siso Kopratasa	Pancawarna	4:34	1999	
"Lela Manja" # ("Pampered Lela")	Copyright Control		Cindai	4:12	1997	
"Lembaran Cinta Pudar" ("A Piece of Fading Love")	Habsah Hassan	Salman	Pancawarna	5:31	1999	
"Lenggang-Lenggok" ("Graceful Movements") Duet with Noraniza Idris	Hairul Anuar Harun; Siti Nurhaliza	Fadzil Ahmad	Seri Balas	4:00	1999	
"Lip Lap Raya" ("Flickering Eid")	Ajay Amai; Glow Rush; Karim Karam; Mike Chan		Promotional single release	2:38	2022	
"Magis" ("Magic")	Mas Dewangga; Jova Devito	Mas Dewangga; Jova Devito; Aden King	Sitism	3:13	2023	
"Mahligai Asmara" ("Palace of Romance")	Hani M.J.	Adnan Abu Hassan	Siti Nurhaliza I	4:10	1996	
"Mahligai Gading" ("Ivory Palace")	Azmeer		Promotional single release	2:59	2006	
"Mahligai Permata" ("Palace of Jewels")	Megamutiara	Khir Rahman	Sahmura	4:17	2000	
"Malaysia Madani Rakyat Disantuni" ("Civilized Malaysia, The People are Cared for")	Affan Mazlan		Malaysia Madani Rakyat Disantuni – Single	3:27	2025	
"Manis Terindah" ("Sweet and Loveliest")	Ad Samad	Aubrey Suwito	SimetriSiti	3:48	2017	
"Masri Manis" ("The Sweet Masri")	Khir Rahman		Sahmura	4:36	2000	
"Mawar Ku" # ("My Rose") 2 By 2 featuring Siti Nurhaliza	Copyright Control		Rindu	4:31	1996	
"Medley Klasik Siti 1" (Note: Featuring four songs; "Buai Laju-Laju", "Tepuk Amai-Amai", "Suriram", and "Bunga Matahari".) # ("Siti's Classical Medley No. 1")	Copyright Control; Rozi Sang Dewi	Copyright Control	Legasi	7:18	2021	
"Medley Klasik Siti 2" (Note: Featuring four songs; "Air Pasang Malam", "Lagu Tiga Kupang", "Anak Odeng", and "Kalau Rasa Gembira".) # ("Siti's Classical Medley No. 2")	Copyright Control; Rozi Sang Dewi	Copyright Control	Legasi	5:43	2021	
"Mekar Hari Raya" ("The Blossoming of Eid ul-Fitr")	Senibayan	Azmeer	Anugerah Aidilfitri	4:18	2003	
"Melawan Kesepian" ("Fighting the Loneliness")	Pongky Barata		Hadiah Daripada Hati	4:34	2007	
"Membaca Gaya Wawasan" (Note: "Membaca Gaya Wasasan" is a promotional theme song to promote reading habit by National Library of Malaysia. Artists involved are including Amy Mastura, Fazley, Dayang Nurfaizah, Afdlin Shauki, Maya Karin, Syafinaz Selamat and many others.) ("Reading is a Visionary Style") Siti Nurhaliza was part of "Kempen Membaca Kebangsaan 2002"	SMDee	Kusham	Promotional single release	5:30	2005	
"Membunuh Benci" ("Killing the Hatred")	Hairul Anuar Harun	Acap	Fragmen	3:43	2014	
"Memories" (Note: The original version was previously recorded by Whitney Houston for American music group, Material.) • Duet with Whitney Houston	Hugh Hopper		Promotional single release	3:25	2016	
"Menamakanmu Cinta" ("Naming You Love") Duet with Ade Govinda	Ade Govinda		Menamakanmu Cinta – Single	4:28	2025	
"Menatap dalam Mimpi" ("Staring in a Dream")	Rozi Sang Dewi	Aubrey Suwito	Unplugged	4:58	2015	
"Menanti Pasti" ("Waiting for Certainty")	Abie Abdullah	Ajai	Kayangan – The Soundtrack	4:37	2002	
"Menjaga Cintamu" ("Caring for Your Love")	Sekar Ayu Asmara	Andi Rianto	Sitism	4:06	2023	
"Menyapa Dunia" ("Greeting the World")	Melly Goeslaw		Sitism	3:05	2023	
"Menyintaimu Selamanya" (Note: "Menyintaimu Selamanya" is the Indonesian version of "Sendiri".) ("Loving You Forever") •	Baiduri	L.Y.	Adiwarna	5:33	1998	
"Meriah Suasana Hari Raya" ("The Festivity of Eid ul-Fitr")	Hairul Anuar Harun	Khir Rahman	Anugerah Aidilfitri	4:47	2003	
"Mikraj Cinta" ("Ascension of Love")	Fedtri Yahya; Hafiz Hamidun	Hafiz Hamidun	Unplugged	4:37	2015	
"Milikmu Selamanya" ("Yours Eternally")	Adi Priyo Sambodo		Milikmu Selamanya – Single	4:19	2012	
"Milikmu Teristimewa" ("Specially Yours")	Habsah Hassan	Azmeer	Safa	4:56	2001	
"Million Miles" (Note: "Million Miles" is the English version of "Dua Dunia".) • Too Phat featuring Siti Nurhaliza	Malique; Joe Flizzow	D'Navigator; Malique; Joe Flizzow; Lah of V.E	Rebirth Into Reality	4:06	2005	
"Muara Hati" ("Estuary of the Heart") Duet with Hafiz Suip	Manusia Putih		Muara Hati – Single	3:45	2012	
"Muhammad Al Ameen" ("The Trustworthy Muhammad") Duet with Rabbani	B. Nury		Muhammad Al Ameen – Single	5:25	2011	
"Mula dan Akhir" ("Start and Finish")	Tinta	Awi Rafael	Fragmen	4:14	2014	
"Mulanya Cinta" ("The Beginning of Love")	Adlin Aman Ramli	Dick Lee	Hadiah Daripada Hati	4:51	2007	
"Musalmah Manis" # ("The Sweet Musalmah")	Copyright Control		Seri Balas	4:21	1999	
"Nadi" ("Pulse")	Mim Hamzah; Illi Diyana		Sitism	3:39	2023	
"Nazam Lebaran" (Note: Nazam is a type of ancient Arabic poetry that is commonly sung as a performance. "Nazam Lebaran" was included earlier in 2001 for Salam Aidilfitri, a special Eid al-Fitr compilation album by Suria Records.) ("The Nazam of Eid ul-Fitr")	Nurul Asyiqin	Pak Ngah	Anugerah Aidilfitri	5:37	2003	
"Nian di Hati" ("Deep Sadness in the Heart")	Azam Dungun	Azmeer	Pancawarna	5:18	1999	
"Nikmat Hari Raya" ("The Pleasures of Eid ul-Fitr") Duet with Noraniza Idris, Liza Hanim, and September 5	September 5	Murad	Seleksi Hari Raya	4:00	1998	
"Nikmat Hari Raya" ("The Pleasures of Eid ul-Fitr") Duet with Noraniza Idris, New Boyz, and Aqasha	September 5	Murad	Gema Hari Raya	3:55	2000	
"Nirmala" ("Pure")	Ce'Kem	Pak Ngah	Sanggar Mustika	5:36	2002	
"Nobody Else" •	Bryan Bouro; Cristian Alexanda		All Your Love	3:53	2011	
"Oda Bumi Anbia" ("An Ode to the Land of the Prophets")	Ad Samad	Mat S. W.	E.M.A.S	4:14	2003	
"Oh Nana" # ("O Nana")	Copyright Control		Konsert Hora Horey	1:45	2018	
"Pada Cintanya" ("On His Love")	Siti Nurhaliza; Rina Khan	Audi Mok	Promotional single release	3:40	2008	
"Pahlawan Ku" ("My Warrior")	Yusoff B.		Lagu-Lagu Patriotik Malaysia – Keranamu Malaysia	2:49	—N/a	
"Panas Berteduh Gelap Bersuluh" ("Seeking Shelter When It Is Hot, Looking for Light When It Is Dark")	Siti Nurhaliza ‡	Khir Rahman	Sanggar Mustika	5:51	2002	
"Panggilan" ("The Calling") Siti Nurhaliza featuring Siti Saida and Siti Saerah	Fedtri Yahya	Audi Mok	Promotional single release	3:32	2010	
"Pastikan" ("Make Sure")	Melly Goeslaw		Transkripsi	4:22	2006	
"Pawana Sampaikanlah Salam" ("O Wind, Send My Regards")	Lokgha	Arid	Sahmura	4:14	2000	
"Patah Hati" # ("Broken-hearted")	Copyright Control		Cindai	5:11	1997	
"Pejam Matamu" ("Close Your Eyes")	Siti Nurhaliza ‡	G-Nola	Prasasti Seni	4:49	2004	
"Pendirianku" ("My Stance")	M. Zulkifli	Zuriani	Prasasti Seni	3:57	2004	
"Penghiburku" ("My Entertainers") Siti Nurhaliza featuring Joe Flizzow	Siti Nurhaliza ‡		SimetriSiti	3:28	2017	
"Percayalah" ("Believe")	Siti Nurhaliza ‡	Ajai	Safa	4:48	2001	
"Pesanan Buat Diri" ("A Note to Self")	Habsah Hassan	Aubrey Suwito	Gema Bumantara	4:38	2025	
"Pintu Rindu" # ("The Door of Yearning")	Hairul Anuar Harun	Copyright Control	Tahajjud Cinta	4:58	2009	
"Pohon Asmara" ("The Tree of Romance")	Aidit Alfian		Bintang Hati	4:25	2005	
"Popaleh Weh" ("Greatness") ±	Rozi Sang Dewi	Rosli Selasih	Konsert Lentera Timur	8:15	2014	
"Pulau Pisang" # ("Pisang Island")	Copyright Control		Seri Balas	3:58	1999	
"Purnama Merindu" ("The Pining Moon")	Lukhman S	Azmeer	Adiwarna	4:24	1998	
"Rahsiaku Milikmu" ("My Secret is Yours")	Siti Nurhaliza ‡	Audi Mok; Siti Nurhaliza	Rahsiaku Milikmu	3:06	2010	
"Rasa Antara Kita" ("The Feelings Between Us")	Zubir Ali	Khairil Johari Johar	Lentera Timur	4:23	2008	
"Raya Nak Ke Mana?" ("Where to Go this Eid al-Fitr?")	Aisha Retno; Amylea Azizan	Aisha Retno; Radi; Amylea Azizan	Raya Nak Ke Mana? – Single	3:17	2025	
"Remember You" • Siti Nurhaliza featuring Sean Kingston	Cristian Alexanda		All Your Love	5:25	2011	
"Rencong" ("Asymmetry")	Fedtri Yahya	Hafiz Hamidun	Gema Bumantara	3:41	2025	
"Romansa Kita" ("Our Romance")	Rozi Sang Dewi	Sharon Paul	Sitism	3:35	2023	
"Rindu di Antara Kita" ("The Longing Feeling Between Us") Siti Nurhaliza featuring Ciang Teng	Hani M.J. Ciang Teng	Adnan Abu Hassan	Siti Nurhaliza II	4:38	1997	
"Rupanya Kita Serupa" ("Apparently We are the Same")	Cat Farrish		Transkripsi	4:56	2006	
"Sakti" ("Magic")	Loloq	Mohar	Prasasti Seni	6:23	2004	
"Salju Kasih NYA" ("The Snow of His Love")	Hani M.J.	Adnan Abu Hassan	Pancawarna	4:33	1999	
"Sama Sama" ("Together")	Faisal	J22-Team	Promotional single release	4:45	2022	
"Sama Sama Kita" ("We are Together") Duet with Alvin Chong and Jaclyn Victor	Audi Mok; Shazee Ishak		Promotional single release	2:22	2023	
"Sanggar Bayu" ("The House of Breeze")	Othman Zainuddin	Adnan Abu Hassan	Siti Nurhaliza I	4:37	1996	
"Sanubari" ("Heartstrings")	Ce'Kem	Adi Priyo	Fragmen	3:31	2014	
"Satu Cinta Dua Jiwa" ("One Love, Two Souls")	Ucu	Azlan Abu Hassan	Adiwarna	4:05	1998	
"Satu Malaysia" ("One Malaysia")	Siti Nurhaliza ‡	Aubrey Suwito	Promotional single release	4:40	2009	
"Sebagai Teman" ("As a Companion") Duet with Krisdayanti	Lew Mabile	Sharon Paul	CTKD: Canda, Tangis, Ketawa, Duka	4:04	2009	
"Sebenar Cinta" ("An Actual Love")	Siti Nurhaliza ‡	Ajai	E.M.A.S	4:24	2003	
"Sejarah" ("History")	Gita Gutawa	Erwin Gutawa	Sejarah – Single	4:02	2024	
"Segala Perasaan" ("All of My Feelings")	Ivan Lahardika		SimetriSiti	4:43	2017	
"Sehebat Matahari" ("As Great as the Sun")	Rozi Sang Dewi	Aubrey Suwito	Sitism	3:55	2023	
"Seindah Biasa" ("As Beautiful as Usual")	Pongky Jikustik		Prasasti Seni	4:45	2004	
"Sekian Lama" ("All This While")	Azalea; Azlan Abu Hassan	Azlan Abu Hassan	Hadiah Daripada Hati	3:53	2007	
"Selawat" § ("Salawat")	Copyright Control		Tahajjud Cinta	4:43	2009	
"Selawat (#JomCintaNabi)" (Note: "Selawat (#JomCintaNabi)" is a promotional single by various Malaysian artists including Hafiz Hamidun, Khai Bahar, Masya Masyitah, UNIC, Usop) ("Salawat") •	Yuzailan Yunus; Yuzart Piano Solo		Promotional single release	6:54	2018	
"Seloka Budi" (Note: Seloka is a variation of Malay poetry that is lighthearted and didactic in nature.) ("A Poem of Courtesy")	Azam Dungun	Adnan Abu Hassan	Lentera Timur	3:28	2008	
"Seluruh Cinta" (Note: "Seluruh Cinta" is included as an additional track for the Indonesian version of Fragmen.) ("All of Love") Duet with Cakra Khan	Krishna Balagita		Fragmen	4:10	2014	
"Semarak Kedamaian" ("Incite the Peace") Duet with Ning Baizura, Erra Fazira, Yusry KRU, Fazley, and Ezlynn	Hafiz Khamis		Promotional single release	2:46	2003	
"Sempadan" ("The Borders")	Hani M.J.	Adnan Abu Hassan	Siti Nurhaliza I	4:48	1996	
"Semoooooanya Baik" (Note: "Semoooooanya Baik" (Semuanya Baik) is the jingle sang by Siti Nurhaliza for Malaysian dairy company Farm Fresh. "It's Allllllll Good" is the English version.) ("It's All Good")	—N/a	—N/a	Promotional single release	—N/a	2022	
"Senandung Hari Raya Untukmu" ("Eid al-Fitr Song for You")	S. Amin Shahab	Mohd Fauzi Darus	Promotional single release	3:25	2022	
"Sendiri" ("Alone")	Baiduri	L.Y.	Adiwarna	5:33	1998	
"Senyawa" ("One Soul")	Senna	Farouk Roman	Sitism	4:45	2023	
"Senyum Minang Manis" ("The Sweet Enticing Smile")	Abot	Zul Mahat	Lentera Timur	3:04	2008	
"Seri Sarawak" # ("Sarawak")	Copyright Control		Gemersik Irama Melayu	5:03	2005	
"Seribu Kemanisan" ("A Thousand of Sweetness")	Azlan Abu Hassan	Zulkefli Majid	Pancawarna	4:56	1999	
"Sesal" ("Regret")	Nurzaidi Abd Rahman		Sesal – Single	4:28	2025	
"Sesuci Lebaran" (Note: "Sesuci Lebaran" was included earlier in 1998 for Seleksi Hari Raya, a special Eid al-Fitr compilation album by Suria Records.) ("As Pure as Eid ul-Fitr")	Hairul Anuar Harun	Pak Ngah	Anugerah Aidilfitri	3:59	2003	
"Siapa Tak Mahu" ("Who Doesn't Want")	John Jeevansingham; Ikhwan Fatanna; Omar K		ManifestaSITI2020	2:58	2020	
"Sirih Pinang" (Note: A traditional gift set that is usually presented to someone special.) #	Copyright Control		Klasik	3:14	2007	
"Siti Ooo Som" (Note: "Siti Ooo Som" was the theme song for Malaysian game show Siti Ooo...Som that she hosted in 2012.) ("Rock paper scissors (with) Siti") Siti Nurhaliza featuring Filsuf	Buddhi Hekayat	Helen Yap	Promotional single release	—N/a	2012	
"Siti Situ Sana Sini" ("Siti is Everywhere")	Cham VE	Damian VE; Lah VE	Transkripsi	4:06	2006	
"Sri Mersing" # ("Mersing")	Copyright Control		Siti Nurhaliza II	5:04	1997	
"Stand Up" •	Cristian Alexanda; Bryan Bouro; Tom Diesel; Ron E Jones		All Your Love	4:56	2011	
"Suara Takbir" # ("Adhan")	Copyright Control		Anugerah Aidilfitri	2:40	2003	
"Sulam Sembilan" ("Nine Stitches")	Lokgha	Pak Ngah	Sanggar Mustika	4:09	2002	
"Sutramaya"	Tinta S.	Aubrey Suwito	Hadiah Daripada Hati	4:01	2007	
"Syair Kamelia" ("A Syair to Camellia")	Nurul Asyiqin	S. Atan	Sanggar Mustika	5:09	2002	
"Syurgaloka" ("Paradise")	Aiman Sidek	Aiman Sidek; Wan Saleh	Gema Bumantara	3:46	2025	
"Tahajjud Cinta" ("A Tahajjud of Love")	Hairul Anuar Harun	Eirma Fatima	Tahajjud Cinta	5:12	2009	
"Tak Boleh Lupa" ("Can't Forget")	Juwie	Johari Teh	Adiwarna	4:47	1998	
"Tak Perlu Ragu" ("No Need to Doubt")	Ade Govinda		SimetriSiti	3:35	2017	
"Tak Rela Berpisah Dari Mu" ("I'm Not Willing to be Separated from You")	Hani M.J.	Adnan Abu Hassan	Adiwarna	5:14	1998	
"Takbir Lebaran" (Note: "Takbir Lebaran" was a rerecorded version of her "Nazam Lebaran" with new lyrics that served as the theme song for Vivo Malaysia's short film for Eid.) ("Takbir for Eid")	—N/a	Pak Ngah	Promotional single release	5:50	2022	
"Takhta Dunia" ("World Throne")	Ryan Kyoto		ManifestaSITI2020	3:14	2020	
"Tanah Air Ku Tanah Air Mu Jua" ("My Homeland is Your Homeland Too") monoloQue featuring Siti Nurhaliza	Loque		Inderaloka	6:12	2013	
"Tanpamu" ("Without You") Duet with Krisdayanti	Charly ST12		CTKD: Canda, Tangis, Ketawa, Duka	4:58	2009	
"Tanpa Dendam di Hati" ("Without a Vengeance in the Heart")	Habsah Hassan	Erwin Gutawa	Transkripsi	4:15	2006	
"Tanpa Kalian" ("Without All of You")	Taufik; Siti Nurhaliza	Taufik	Hadiah Daripada Hati	4:31	2007	
"Tanpa Diri-Mu" ("Without You")	Luca Sickta		Sitism	4:10	2023	
"Terang" ("Bright")	Shah Shamshiri	Aubrey Suwito	ManifestaSITI2020	3:52	2020	
"Teratas" ("Highest")	Fedtri Yahya	Tomok; Rudi Nastia	Sitism	4:20	2023	
"Teratai Menjelma" ("Manifestation of the Lotus")	Raja Kobat Salehuddin		ManifestaSITI2020	3:54	2020	
"Terbaik Bagimu" ("The Best for You")	Ade Govinda		Fragmen	4:10	2014	
"Tertulis Nama Kita" ("Our Names Were Written")	Rozi Sang Dewi	Siti Nurhaliza ‡	ManifestaSITI2020	3:27	2020	
"Tetap di Sini" (Note: "Tetap di Sini" is a single to promote Paloh, a 2003 Malaysian film. It was later included in Best of Original Soundtrack, a special compilation album by Suria Records.) ("Still Here")	Aiman	Hani M.J.	Best of Original Soundtrack	4:33	1997	
"The Colour of My Love" •	Arthur Ganov	David Foster	Siti Nurhaliza II	3:30	1997	
"Tiga Malam" (Note: The solo version of "Tiga Malam" by Siti Nurhaliza was included in Meletup, a special compilation album by Suria Records in 1998.) # ("Three Nights") 2 By 2 featuring Siti Nurhaliza	Copyright Control		Pak Pung Pak Mustafe	5:14	1997	
"Tirai Semalam" ("Yesterday's Veil")	S. Amin Shahab	Fauzi Marzuki	Siti Nurhaliza II	5:04	1997	
"Tonight" •	Bryan Bouro; Cristian Alexanda		All Your Love	4:09	2011	
"Untuk Selamanya" ("Forever")	Rashid S. Julfekar	Julfekar	E.M.A.S	4:54	2003	
"Untuk Terakhir Kali" ("For the Last Time")	Mohariz Yakup	Sharon Paul	Bintang Hati	4:28	2005	
"Usah Diragui" ("Don't Doubt")	Habsah Hassan	Zul Mahat	Siti Nurhaliza II	4:53	1997	
"Wajah Kekasih" ("Lover's Face")	Hani M.J.	Adnan Abu Hassan	Siti Nurhaliza II	5:16	1997	
"Walinong Sari" # ("Princess Walinong Sari")	Copyright Control		Seri Balas	3:32	1999	
"Wanita" ("Women")	Shanty Ramadani; Siti Nurhaliza	Muhammad Fahmi Rizal	Hadiah Daripada Hati	4:25	2007	
"Warna Dunia" ("Colours of the World")	Rozi Sang Dewi	Lin Li Zhen	Fragmen	4:12	2014	
"Warna Warna Malaysiaku Gemilang" ("Colors of My Brilliant Malaysia")	Siti Nurhaliza ‡	Aubrey Suwito	Promotional single release	3:35	2007	
"We'll Be As One" (Note: "We'll Be As One" is the English version of "Satu Cinta Dua Jiwa".) •	Ucu	Azlan Abu Hassan	The Malaysia Book of Records – Most Awards Won Artiste	4:06	2001	
"With All Our Hearts" (Note: It has two versions, English and Bahasa Malaysia.) •	—N/a	—N/a	Charity Gala Dinner With Siti Nurhaliza	1:24	2006	
"Xin Yuan" (心愿) (Note: "Xin Yuan" was included earlier in 1999 for Candy Cheah's debut album, Wa Zi (襪子). The song is also the Mandarin version of "Kedamaian" which was included in Pancawarna in the same year.) • ("Wish") Candy Cheah featuring Siti Nurhaliza	Cheah Kee Ling	Mark Wong	Siti & Friends	4:55	2010	
"Ya Maulai" ("O Sir")	Hairul Anuar Harun	Pak Ngah	Sahmura	5:39	2000	
"Ya Rasullulah" ("O Rasullulah")	Abu Bakar Mohd Yatim		Tahajjud Cinta	4:55	2009	
"You Came to Me" • Sami Yusuf featuring Siti Nurhaliza	Sami Yusuf; Yasin Sulaiman	Sami Yusuf	Salaam	4:12	2012	
"Yi Jia Ren" (一家人) • ("One Family")	Chen Jian Ming (陳建名)	Wang Jian Xun (王建勋)	Promotional single release	3:14	2010	
"Yue Liang Dai Biao Wo De Xin" (月亮代表我的心) (Note: "Yue Liang Dai Biao Wo De Xin" was included earlier in 2005 for My Samsung My World, a special compilation album by Samsung Malaysia.) • ("The Moon Represents My Heart")	Sun Yi (孫儀)	Weng Ching-hsi (翁清溪)	Siti & Friends	3:14	2010	
"Zapin Bernasib" # ("Zapin of Misfortune")	Copyright Control		Pewaris Lagu-Lagu Tradisional	5:03	2012	
"Zapin Cinta Asmara" ("Zapin of Love and Romance")	Rozek	To'Ki	Sahmura	4:32	2000	
"Zheng Fu (征服)" (Note: "Zheng Fu" was included earlier in 2005 for My Samsung My World, a special compilation album by Samsung Malaysia.) • ("Conquer")	Yuan Wei Jen		Siti & Friends	4:33	2010	

== See also ==
- Siti Nurhaliza discography
