= Sahmura =

2000 studio album by Siti Nurhaliza

Studio album by Siti Nurhaliza
- Released: 1 January 2000
- Recorded: June – December 1999
- Genre: Ethnic; traditional
- Length: 48:54
- Label: Suria Records; EMI Music Indonesia
- Producer: Pak Ngah; S. Atan; To'Ki; Rosli Selasih

Siti Nurhaliza chronology
Pancawarna (1999)	Sahmura (2000)	Safa (2001)

Singles from Sahmura
- 1. "Balqis" Released: 3 January 2000; 2. "Ya Maulai" Released: 21 April 2000; 3. "Mahligai Permata" Released: 8 September 2000

Sahmura is the sixth studio album by Malaysian singer Siti Nurhaliza. It was released by Suria Records and EMI Music Indonesia on 1 January 2000. The launch was held at KLCC during the ceremony to welcome the new millennium. Sahmura is a traditional album to continue Malaysian traditions, and the motto for this album is, "The Beginning for Another Thousand Years".

Sahmura contains several songs from famous composers, Pak Ngah, S. Atan, To'Ki and Rosli Selasih. Among the standout singles are "Balqis" and "Ya Maulai".

== Background ==
After the success of her first traditional album, Cindai and the traditional duet album Seri Balas with Noraniza Idris, in May 1999, Siti Nurhaliza announced that she would be releasing her second traditional album, which was scheduled to hit the market by the end of 1999 or at least at the beginning of the new millennium 2000. The recording of the Sahmura, produced by To'Ki, Suhaimi "Pak Ngah" Zain (who also produced the Cindai album) and Rosli Selasih, took place from June 1999 to December 1999.

Other workers involved in the production of the Sahmura album were Khir Rahman, S. Atan, Siso Kopratasa, Hairul Anuar Harun, Nurul Asyiqin and Arid. Although famous for songs of various genres such as pop, R&B and ballads, it turns out that Siti never ignored traditional and ethnic music because she was raised by a family of traditional music lovers.

== Release and promotion ==
To promote Sahmura, the songs "Balqis", "Ya Maulai" and "Mahligai Permata" were released as singles. All three songs were also performed by Siti for her performance at the Siti Nurhaliza Mega Concert on 30 June 2001. In July 2013, Siti sang "Balqis", "Ya Maulai" and "Mahligai Permata" live with new arrangements by Yuzaifullah Mohd Yusof during her performance at her residency concert, Siti Nurhaliza in Symphony which was held for three days at the Petronas Philharmonic Hall and her performance attracted the attention of the audience present.

== Reception ==
Professional ratings
Review scores
Source	Rating
Discogs	4/5 stars
Harian Metro	4/5 stars
New Straits Times	4/5 stars

Sahmura received rave reviews from music critics. Marina Abdul Ghani of The Malay Mail in her overall review of "Sahmura" commented "As expected, Siti gives her best performance on this album and her vocals are getting more mature." Zainal Alam Kadir of New Straits Times gave Sahmura four out of five stars. He said, "Sahmura is a seductive product, just what you would expect from a good pop album, sweet, warm and rich." Saniboey of Harian Metro also gave Sahmura four stars. He said in his review, "Overall, I found the album challenging because of its stylistics. The Malay language used is not archaic, but it is rarely used and that is the main challenge for the listener of this album." Sahmura was another commercially successful album by Siti. It peaked at the top of the RIM local album chart and over 100,000 units were sold.

== Track listing ==
No.	Title	Lyrics	Music	Length
1.	"Balqis"	Hairul Anuar Harun	Pak Ngah	4:42
2.	"Joget Kasih Tak Sudah"	Nurul Asyiqin	S. Atan	5:07
3.	"Ya Maulai"	Hairul Anuar Harun	Pak Ngah	5:43
4.	"Pawana Sampaikan Salam"	Lokgha	Arid	4:18
5.	"Mahligai Permata"	Megamutiara	Khir Rahman	4:21
6.	"Masri Manis"	Khir Rahman	Khir Rahman	4:40
7.	"Berpantun Kasih"	Siso Kopratasa	S. Atan	4:45
8.	"Zapin Cinta Asmara"	Rozek	To'Ki	4:36
9.	"Canggai"	Tok Wan	Rosli Selasih	4:48
10.	"Keroncong Si Endang Endong"	Raja Kobat	Raja Kobat	5:32
Total length:				48:54

== Charts ==
Chart (2000)	Position
Malaysia (Carta RIM)	1

== Certification ==
Country	Certification	Sales/Shipments
Malaysia	2x Platinum	100,000
