= Anugerah Aidilfitri =

2003 studio album by Siti Nurhaliza

Studio album (Festive) by Siti Nurhaliza
- Released: 10 December 2003
- Genre: Pop, Festive
- Length: 47:52
- Label: Suria Records
- Producer: Dato' Siti Nurhaliza, Pak Ngah, S. Atan, Azmeer & Khir Rahman

Siti Nurhaliza chronology
E.M.A.S (2003)	Anugerah Aidilfitri (2003)	Prasasti Seni (2004)

Singles from Anugerah Aidilfitri
- 1. "Anugerah Aidilfitri (new song)" 2. "Mekar Hari Raya (new song)" 3. "Meriah Suasana Hari Raya (new song)"

Anugerah Aidilfitri is the tenth studio album by Malaysian pop singer-songwriter Dato' Siti Nurhaliza which was released a week before Hari Raya Aidilfitri of 2003.

== Background ==
Anugerah Aidilfitri compiles all of Siti's hit Raya songs, including "Sesuci Lebaran", "Nazam Lebaran", and "Air Mata Syawal", all of which are composed by Pak Ngah, as well as a song by traditional composer S. Atan, "Bila Hari Raya Menjelma". Siti also sings a cover version of P. Ramlee's Raya song "Suara Takbir".

The track "Anugerah Aidilfitri" was released as the first single. It was composed by music director Pak Ngah, with lyrics by Ce'Kem of "Nirmala" fame. This was followed by two more original songs including "Mekar Hari Raya", the second track from the album, composed by Azmeer, with lyrics by Senibayan. "Meriah Suasana Hari Raya", the third single, is another typical raya song by composer Khir Rahman and lyricist Hairul Anuar Harun.

== Track listing ==
#	Title	Songwriters
1.	"Anugerah Aidilfitri"	Pak Ngah, Ce'kem
2.	"Mekar Hari Raya"	Azmeer, Senibayan
3.	"Meriah Suasana Hari Raya"	Khir Rahman, Hairul Anuar Harun
4.	"Bila Hari Raya Menjelma" (Note: "Bila Hari Raya Menjelma" was included earlier in 2000 on Aidilfitri Di Alaf Baru, a special Eid al-Fitr compilation album by Suria Records.)	S. Atan, Nurul Asyiqin
5.	"Sesuci Lebaran" (Note: "Sesuci Lebaran" was included earlier in 1998 on Seleksi Hari Raya, a special Eid al-Fitr compilation album by Suria Records.)	Pak Ngah, Hairul Anuar Harun
6.	"Suara Takbir" (Note: "Suara Takbir" was included earlier in 1997 on Kenangan Aidilfitri, a special Eid al-Fitr compilation album by Suria Records.)	Copyright controlled
7.	"Nazam Lebaran" (Note: "Nazam Lebaran" was included earlier in 2001 on Salam Aidilfitri, a special Eid al-Fitr compilation album by Suria Records.)	Pak Ngah, Nurul Asyiqin
8.	"Air Mata Syawal" (Note: "Air Mata Syawal" was included earlier in 2002 on Fiesta Aidilfitri, a special Eid al-Fitr compilation album by Suria Records.)	Pak Ngah, Nurul Asyiqin
9.	"Anugerah Aidilfitri"	Instrumental
10.	"Sesuci Lebaran"	Instrumental

=== VCD/DVD Version ===
#	Title	Songwriters
1.	"Introduksi"	
2.	"Anugerah Aidilfitri"	Pak Ngah, Ce'kem
3.	"Mekar Hari Raya"	Azmeer, Senibayan
4.	"Meriah Suasana Hari Raya"	Khir Rahman, Hairul Anuar Harun
5.	"Bila Hari Raya Menjelma"	S. Atan, Nurul Asyiqin
6.	"Sesuci Lebaran"	Pak Ngah, Hairul Anuar Harun
7.	"Suara Takbir"	Copyright controlled
8.	"Nazam Lebaran"	Pak Ngah, Nurul Asyiqin
9.	"Air Mata Syawal"	Pak Ngah, Nurul Asyiqin
10.	"Nikmat Hari Raya"	Murad, Razak, Yaakob, Zainal
11.	"Aidilfitri Di Alaf Baru"	Khalil Shariff, Asmah Ismail

== See also ==
- "Hari Kemenangan", an Eid song recorded and released by Siti Nurhaliza in 2016
