= Gema Bumantara =

Studio album by Siti Nurhaliza
- Released: 28 October 2025
- Recorded: 2024 – 2025
- Studios: Pro Recording Studio, Cheras
- Genres: Pop; traditional
- Length: 37:25
- Labels: Siti Nurhaliza Productions; SN Legacy; Universal Music Group (Malaysia)
- Producers: Dato' Sri Siti Nurhaliza (executive); Kenny Ong (executive); Aubrey Suwito; Hafiz Hamidun; Melly Goeslaw; Aisha Retno

Siti Nurhaliza chronology
Sitism (2023)	Gema Bumantara (2025)

Singles from Sitism
- 1. "Kumbang Bunga" Released: 22 October 2025; 2. "Rencong" Released: 13 November 2025; 3. "Kaca Dan Permata" Released: 3 December 2025; 4. "Kesuma" Released: 18 June 2026

Gema Bumantara (Echoes of the Archipelago) is the twenty-second studio album by Malaysian singer, Siti Nurhaliza. It was released by Universal Music Malaysia and her own companies, Siti Nurhaliza Productions and SN Legacy on 28 October 2025. It is her first traditional album in 17 years since Lentera Timur (2008) and was a collaboration between Malaysian and Indonesian composers, lyricists, and producers. The album's lead single, "Kumbang Bunga" featuring Indonesian singer Lesti, was released on 22 October, six days prior to the album's release.

== Background and recording ==
After the release of her fourth traditional album Lentera Timur in December 2008, Siti Nurhaliza decided to take a break from making any traditional albums. However, in 2018, she had released the single "Anta Permana", which was later included in ManifestaSITI2020 (2020). Six years later, she decided to return to the studio and announced that she had begun working on what was to become Gema Bumantara. Recording of the album took a year to complete. According to Siti, Gema Bumantara serves as a continuation of her first four traditional albums that were released between 1997 and 2008. She described the album as her love for the Malaysian traditional music, which have been "always hold a special place" in her heart. It also served as a way for her to propel the genre to the new audience.

For the album, Siti Nurhaliza has received more than 200 song submissions, including from Indonesian songwriters. Out of the 200 songs submitted to her, only 10 songs were selected after a stringent evaluation process to aligned with traditional concept she has been envisioned. She commented on the song selection, "Honestly, all were great. It was tough to choose just 10 because actually 40 were really good — imagine narrowing that down to 10. If we wanted, we could easily produce another album because there were so many quality works".

The album also received support from MyCreative Ventures, an agency under the Ministry of Communications, under the Domestic Market Capability Fund 2.0. Siti said the funding covered 5 songs, while the other 5 was funded by herself using her own money. Apart from employing local Malaysian talents, Siti also sourced musicians and artists from Indonesia to contribute to the materials in Gema Bumantara.

== Artwork and title ==
The album's title, Gema Bumantara, as stated by Siti Nurhaliza, has a larger meaning and a symbolic to her hope "to make a traditional music continued to echoed all the time".

== Release and promotion ==
The album was released in a digital format on 28 October 2025, while the album's CD format expected to be released in January 2026 to coincide with her 30th anniversary concert and her 47th birthday.

== Track listing ==
No.	Title	Writer(s)	Composer	Length
1.	"Kumbang Bunga" (feat. Lesti)	Firdaus Rahmat, Iqie Hugh	Firdaus Rahmat, Iqie Hugh	3:09
2.	"Hati Yang Rindu"	Usop Kopratasa	Usop Kopratasa	4:24
3.	"Rencong"	Fedtri Yahya	Hafiz Hamidun	3:41
4.	"Pesanan Buat Diri"	Dato' Habsah Hassan	Aubrey Suwito	4:38
5.	"Kaca Dan Permata" (feat. Umairah)	Omar K, Shazriq Azeman	Omar K, Shazriq Azeman	3:51
6.	"Syurgaloka"	Aiman Sidek	Aiman Sidek, Wan Saleh	3:46
7.	"Hujung Bumi"	Affan Mazlan, Danish Norr	Affan Mazlan, Danish Norr	3:06
8.	"Kesuma"	Aisha Retno	Aisha Retno, RADi	3:51
9.	"Jenjang Cinta"	Dato' Sri Siti Nurhaliza, Melly Goeslaw	Melly Goeslaw	3:33
10.	"Cenderamaya"	Amni Musfirah, Irena Taib, Jamilah Abu Bakar	Amni Musfirah, Irena Taib, Jamilah Abu Bakar	3:07
Total length:				37:25

== Certifications ==
Country	Certification	Sales/Shipments
Malaysia	Sold out	1,000

== Release history ==
Region	Release date	Format	Label
Malaysia	28 October 2025	CD, digital download	Siti Nurhaliza Productions, Universal Music Group (Malaysia)
