= Pancawarna =

Studio album by Siti Nurhaliza
- Released: 5 July 1999
- Recorded: 1998–1999
- Genres: Pop, dance, R&B, pop rock
- Length: 49:00
- Label: Suria Records
- Producers: Azmeer, Zulkefli Majid, Helen Yap, Adnan Abu Hassan, Siso, Mark Wong, Ajai, Ross Ariffin, Alfa/Rummie & Salman

Siti Nurhaliza chronology
Seri Balas (1999)	Pancawarna (1999)	Sahmura (2000)

Singles from Pancawarna
- 1. "Nian Di Hati" Released: 1999; 2. "Kau Kekasihku" Released: 1999; 3. "Engkau Bagai Permata" Released: 1999

Pancawarna is the fifth studio album by Malaysian pop singer, Siti Nurhaliza, released on 7 May 1999 by Suria Records.

== Production ==
The album was recorded by Siti Nurhaliza between 1998 and 1999 following the success of Adiwarna.

"Kau Kekasihku" is the most highlighted song in this album for its popularity plus the voice of Siti Nurhaliza, the composition by Ajai and the melancholic lyrics by Alam Maya. It is said to have been the first song ever composed by Ajai himself to Siti.

Almost every song in this album really challenge Siti's vocal performance and the most highly enduring songs would be "Kurniaan Dalam Samaran" and "Nian Di Hati".

In "Lembaran Cinta Pudar" Siti made an attempt to have a brief monologue which is quite intriguing to listeners.

The song title "Lelaki (warkah seorang anak)" was specially dedicated to then-Prime Minister of Malaysia, Mahathir Mohamad. The lyrics were written by Habsah Hassan and composed by one of the Kopratasa's member (Siso). This song is made special just for him as a remembrance of his contribution to Malaysia.

== Reception ==
Pancawarna was released on 7 May 1999 to popular success and receive positive reviews from music critics. According to Marina Abdul Ghani of The Malay Mail, Pancawarna which means colourful in English refers to the wide varieties of music styles that were featured in the album. The album received mixed to positive reviews from music critics. Saniboey of Harian Metro gave the album three stars. He commented the album missed its target, inconsistent with its melodies, and too cheesy. Zainal Alam Kadir of New Straits Times gave the album three and half stars. He echoed Saniboey's opinion on the presence of multiple heart-wrenching ballads in the album, but he has no qualms with Siti's vocals. In a positive review by Marina of The Malay Mail, she commended Siti's vocals and how well she carried her vocals on all songs featured in the album. Pancawarna was well received by the public. More than 100,000 units of Pancawarna were sold and it also charted at number one on RIM's local album chart.

== Track listing ==
No.	Title	Writer(s)	Composer(s)	Length
1.	"Nian di Hati"	Azam Dungun	Azmeer	5:18
2.	"Seribu Kemanisan"	Hazlan Abu Hassan	Zulkefli Majid	4:56
3.	"Engkau Bagaikan Permata"	Sham Amir Hussain, Siti Nurhaliza	Helen Yap	5:06
4.	"Salju Kasih-NYA"	Hani MJ	Adnan Abu Hassan	4:33
5.	"Lelaki (Warkah Seorang Anak)"	Habsah Hassan	Siso Kopratasa	4:34
6.	"Kedamaian"	Hani MJ	Mark Wong	4:50
7.	"Kau Kekasihku"	Alam Maya	Ajai	5:21
8.	"Kurniaan Dalam Samaran"	S. Amin Shahab	Ross Ariffin	4:18
9.	"Langkah di Persada"	Tisya	Rickie Koes	4:33
10.	"Lembaran Cinta Pudar"	Habsah Hassan	Salman	5:31
Total length:				49:00

== Credits and personnel ==
Credits adapted from Adiwarna booklet liner notes.

- Ajai – producer
- Alfa/Rummie – producer
- Ross Ariffin – producer
- Ariffin – promotional unit
- Azmeer – producer
- Bard – promotional unit
- Bustamam – photography
- CT – vocals
- Daniel – vocals
- Azam Dungun – songwriter
- Jason Foo – production coordinator
- Adnan Abu Hassan – producer
- Hazlan Abu Hassan – songwriter
- Sham Amir Hussain – A & R manager, songwriter
- Habsah Hassan – songwriter
- June – vocals
- Ricky Koes – producer
- Siso Kopratasa – producer
- Genesis Mastering Lab – mastering
- Lau – engineer
- Lin – promotional unit, vocals
- Tan Su Loke – executive producer
- Zulkefli Majid – A & R coordinator, producer, vocals
- Alam Maya – songwriter
- Hani MJ – songwriter
- Nan – promotional unit
- Siti Nurhaliza – songwriter
- Nurul – make-up
- AS Design & Print – creation
- Rahayu – promotional unit
- Salman – producer
- Shon – vocals
- S. Amin Shahab – songwriter
- Alison Tee – project manager
- Tisya – songwriter, vocals
- Vincent – engineer
- Mark Wong – producer
- Wong – engineer
- Helen Yap – producer

== Awards ==
Platinum

- 2 Platinum Award for "Pancawarna"

Juara Lagu 2000

- Best Ballad (Kau Kekasihku)

Juara Lagu 2001

- Best Pop Rock (Engkau Bagaikan Permata)

Anugerah Majalah Rish (URS) 2001

- Most Popular Love Song (Kau Kekasihku)
