= Safa (album) =

2001 studio album by Siti Nurhaliza

Studio album by Siti Nurhaliza
- Released: 11 January 2001
- Recorded: April – December 2000
- Genre: Pop
- Length: 45:52
- Label: Suria Records; EMI Music Indonesia
- Producer: Adnan Abu Hassan; Zulkifli Majid; Helen Yap; Azmeer; Pak Ngah; Ahmad Izham Omar; Ajai; Wong; Aubrey Suwito

Siti Nurhaliza chronology
Sahmura (2000)	Safa (2001)	Sanggar Mustika (2002)

Singles from Safa
- 1. "Percayalah" Released: 1 January 2001; 2. "Lakaran Kehidupan" Released: 3 May 2001; 3. "Bicara Manis Menghiris Kalbu" Released: 6 July 2001; 4. "Azimat Cinta" Released: 15 September 2001; 5. "Indah Percintaan" Released: 21 October 2001

Safa (Pureness) is the seventh studio album by Malaysian singer Siti Nurhaliza. It was released on 11 January 2001 by Suria Records. Five singles were released from the album, with "Percayalah" released as the lead single.

== Production ==
Safa was heavily influenced by Siti Nurhaliza. She began working on the album by the first quarter of 2000 following the commercial success of her previous six albums. Siti said that the album's title, Safa means Pureness, while stated that the album is meaningful to her and specially dedicated to her fans. For the album, she worked with Ahmad Izham Omar and Aubrey Suwito as the album's producer as well as Adnan Abu Hassan (who previously produced her previous albums), Azmeer, Zulkifli Majid, Pak Ngah and Helen Yap.

== Track listing ==
No.	Title	Lyrics	Music	Length
1.	"Azimat Cinta"	Hazida	Adnan Abu Hassan	4:57
2.	"Jalinan Cinta"	Siti Nurhaliza, Haslan	Helen Yap	4:38
3.	"Percayalah"	Siti Nurhaliza	Ajai	3:54
4.	"Lakaran Kehidupan"	Siti Nurhaliza	Mat SW	4:56
5.	"Kudus Sinarmu"	Ce'kem	Pak Ngah	5:46
6.	"Kau Ku Sayang"	Pot Amir	Pot Amir	5:23
7.	"Beradu Di Khayalan"	Tisya	Aubrey	3:16
8.	"Indah Percintaan"	M. Zulkifli	Nyzar	4:48
9.	"Milikmu Teristimewa"	Habsah Hassan	Azmeer	3:40
10.	"Bicara Manis Menghiris Kalbu"	Lukhman S	Aiman	4:03
Total length:				45:52

== Release and reception ==
Safa was released on what would have been Siti Nurhaliza's 22nd birthday, on 11 January 2001. It peaked at number two on RIM's local album chart.^{[note 1]} It was Malaysia's best-selling local album of the year when more than 80,000 units were sold in 2001 alone.

Safa received mixed to positive reviews from music reviewers. Zainal Alam Kadir of the New Straits Times gave the album two and half stars. Zainal wasn't pleased with the presence of too many ballads in the album. He reviewed the album, "None of the songs is memorable enough. Siti's voice might be the only saving grace." In a more positive review by Marina Abdul Ghani of The Malay Mail, she commended Siti's vocals and singled out "Percayalah" as her favorite song from the album. She wrote Siti's rendition of the song as "next to perfect". She concluded her review as "Safa offers a variety of polished songs that showcases Siti's versatility as a singer." Saniboey Mohd Ismail of Harian Metro rated the album with four stars. In his final comment, he wrote, "[...] Siti's 2001 beginning is really good with Safa, although it is really hard for me to say this is her best album." (Note: Original: "[...] Permulaan 2001 Siti memang baik menerusi Safa, namun saya sukar sekali mahu mengatakan ini adalah album terbaiknya.") In a three out four star review by Joko of Tembang, he reviewed Siti's vocals in Safa favourably. He commended how Safa explored Siti's vocals to the maximum and the clarity and quality of Siti's voice.

== Personnel ==
Credits adapted from Safa booklet liner notes.

- Siti Nurhaliza - vocals, backing vocals
- Haslan - backing vocals
- Ailena Ali (Lin) - backing vocals
- Sanizar Ayin - backing vocals
- Swara - backing vocals
- Zulkifli Majid - backing vocals, composer, producer, A&R
- AS Design & Print - cover, design, printing
- Tan Su Loke - executive producer
- Wong - producer
- A.D. Ho - photography
- Nurul Shukor - make-up artist
- Kenzo - wardrobe, recorder
- Ahmad Izham Omar - composer, producer (track 7)
- Aubrey Suwito - composer, producer (track 9, 10)
- Azmeer - composer, producer (track 4)
- Helen Yap - composer, producer (track 3)
- Pak Ngah - composer, producer (track 6)
- Adnan Abu Hassan - composer, producer, backing vocals (track 1)
- Ajai - composer, producer, backing vocals (track 8)
- Jason Foo - production manager
- Azmi Ali - promotion
- Bard - promotion
- Rahayu - promotion
- Shahrin Halim - promotion
- Vincent Chan - recorder
- Koh - recorder
- PRO Recording Studio - recording studio
- Genesis Mastering Lab - mastering

== Footnotes ==
- Note 1: In the Hits of the World section of Billboard, Safa was listed at number three for the RIM's overall Malaysia album chart for week ending 6 February 2001. As the highest positioning local album in the chart, Safa by default should be at number one for RIM's local album chart. However, on Hisham Harun's Hit List section of The New Straits Times, for week ending 5 February 2001, Safa was not even listed for RIM's local album chart. It is unclear which information is correct.
