= Hadiah Daripada Hati =

Album by Siti Nurhaliza

Studio album by Siti Nurhaliza
- Released: 10 December 2007
- Genre: Pop
- Length: 47:52
- Label: SNP, Suria
- Producer: Dato' Siti Nurhaliza, Aubrey Suwito, Audi Mok, Jenny Chin, Greg Henderson & Sharon Paul

Siti Nurhaliza chronology
Transkripsi (2006)	Hadiah Daripada Hati (2007)	Lentera Timur (2008)

Singles from Hadiah Daripada Hati
- 1. "Ku Mahu"; 2. "Melawan Kesepian"; 3. "Cintamu"; 4. "Wanita"

Hadiah Daripada Hati is the thirteenth studio album by Malaysian pop singer-songwriter Dato' Siti Nurhaliza which was released on 10 December 2007.

== Background ==
Siti initially intended her upcoming album to be a traditional one, diligently gathering new materials for it. However, faced with a shortage of suitable content, she decided to pivot towards producing another pop album. Reports indicate that Siti commenced her recordings during the month of Ramadan.

The first single from the album, "Ku Mahu," has been officially confirmed by Siti. Preceding its release, "Hati" was unveiled in September 2007 as part of the film soundtrack for 1957: Hati Malaya. Meanwhile, the third track, "Mulanya Cinta," made its debut in the musical play titled P. Ramlee: The Musical, paying homage to the iconic Malay actor Tan Sri P. Ramlee.

"Melawan Kesepian" has been chosen as the second single, while just weeks before the 15th Anugerah Industri Muzik, Siti opted to release "Cintamu" as the third single from the album. Notably, "Cintamu" clinched the title of Best Musical Arrangement In A Song at the awards ceremony, surpassing her other tracks "Hati" and "Sekian Lama".

Finally, "Wanita" is speculated to be the last single from this album.

== Track listing ==
Her leading Single "Ku Mahu" has reached to its peak position, no.1, adding to her uncountable no.1 singles in Malaysia.

No.	Title	Lyrics	Music	Length
1.	"Ku Mahu"	Rina Khan	Audi Mok	3:13
2.	"Melawan Kesepian"	Pongky Barata	Pongky Barata	4:34
3.	"Mulanya Cinta"	Adlin Aman Ramlie	Dick Lee	4:51
4.	"Tanpa Kalian"	Taufik, Dato Siti Nurhaliza	Taufik	4:31
5.	"Biarkan"	Azalea	Azlan Abu Hassan	3:50
6.	"Kerana Dirimu"	Cynthia Lamusu	Cynthia Lamusu	5:28
7.	"Hati"	Shuhaimi Baba	Sharon Paul	4:19
8.	"Wanita"	Shanty Ramadani, Dato Siti Nurhaliza	Muhamad Fahmi	4:25
9.	"Cintamu"	Ahmad Fedtri Yahya	Sharon Paul	4:47
10.	"Sutramaya"	Tinta S.	Aubrey Suwito	4:01
11.	"Sekian Lama"	Azalea	Azlan Abu Hassan	3:53

== Awards ==
=== 2008 ===
Awards Ceremony	Award
Anugerah Industri Muzik	Best Pop Album
Anugerah Industri Muzik	Best Vocal Performance in an Album (Female)
Anugerah Industri Muzik	Best Musical Arrangement in a Song (Cintamu)
