= CTKD: Canda, Tangis, Ketawa, Duka =

CTKD

Studio album by Krisdayanti and Siti Nurhaliza
- Released: 28 December 2009
- Recorded: 2009
- Genre: Pop
- Length: 44:12
- Label: SNP, Suria
- Producer: Aubrey Suwito, Audi Mok, Charly ST12, Dato' Siti Nurhaliza, Krisdayanti

Krisdayanti album chronology
Aku Wanita Biasa (2009)	CTKD (2009)	Cintaku Kan Selalu Menemanimu (2011)

Siti Nurhaliza chronology
Tahajjud Cinta (2009)	CTKD (2009)	All Your Love (2011)

Singles from CTKD
- 1. "Amarah" Released: 2009

Professional ratings
Review scores
Source	Rating
Fairuz Selamat	5/5 stars
Pangeranz Umar	5/5 stars

CTKD is first duet album Indonesian singer Krisdayanti and Malaysian singer Siti Nurhaliza. CTKD is the abbreviation of Canda (Joke), Tangis (Cry), Ketawa (Laugh), Duka (Sad), since they are both known as CT (Siti) and KD (Krisdayanti). The album was released on 28 December 2009.

== Track listing ==
With six songs, the album was created by famous Malaysian and Indonesian composers and writers like Aubrey Suwito, Audi Mok, Sharon Paul and others to suit both their vocal range and harmony. For the first time in this album, Dato’ Siti Nurhaliza uses vocalist from ST12, Charly. It also includes 4 bonus instrumental songs of their songs on the album.

#	Title	Songwriter(s)	
1.	"Jika Kau Tak Datang"	Audi Mok, Kris Dayanti & Riznadianka	3:43
2.	"Sebagai Teman"	Sharon Paul, Lew Mabile	4:04
3.	"Tanpamu"	Charly ST12	4:58
4.	"Amarah"	Audi Mok, Dato' Siti Nurhaliza	3:41
5.	"Hanya Dia"	Aubrey Suwito, Pacha Andrian	5:20
6.	"Dalam Diamku"	Audi Mok, Kris Dayanti & Riznadianka	4:17
7.	"Tanpamu (Minus One)"		5:00
8.	"Amarah (Minus One)"		3:40
9.	"Hanya Dia (Minus One)"		5:21
10.	"Dalam Diamku (Minus One)"		4:15

=== Indonesia Version ===
#	Title	Songwriter(s)	
1.	"Jika Kau Tak Datang"	Audi Mok, Kris Dayanti & Riznadianka	3:43
2.	"Sebagai Teman"	Sharon Paul, Lew Mabile	4:04
3.	"Tanpamu"	Charly ST12	4:58
4.	"Amarah"	Audi Mok, Dato' Siti Nurhaliza	3:41
5.	"Hanya Dia"	Aubrey Suwito, Pacha Andrian	5:20
6.	"Dalam Diamku"	Audi Mok, Kris Dayanti & Riznadianka	4:17
