= Tahajjud Cinta =

Studio album by Siti Nurhaliza
- Released: 9 September 2009 link
- Recorded: 2009
- Genre: Spiritual
- Label: SNP, Suria
- Producer: Dato' Siti Nurhaliza, Audi Mok, Eddie Marzuki, Tya Subkiato

Siti Nurhaliza chronology
| Lentera Timur (2008) | Tahajjud Cinta (2009) | CTKD (2009) |

Singles from Tahajjud Cinta
- 1. "Ketika Cinta" Released: 2008; 2. "Batasku Asaku" Released: 2008; 3. "Ku Percaya Ada Cinta" Released: 2009

Tahajjud Cinta is the fifteenth album by Dato' Siti Nurhaliza and also her first album to be categorised as a spiritual or religious album. The album was released on 9 September 2009, during the holy month of Ramadan to celebrate the lack of albums in the market that propose the holistic genre. This is the first album to be released by Siti Nurhaliza in her father's absence.

== Background ==
The album was composed of eight songs. Two songs, Ketika Cinta and Pintu Rindu, were cover versions. The first was a covered version of a single by an Indonesian religious singer, Opick, whereas the latter was originally in Arabic before it was recorded into Malay. The song Ketika Cinta was also used in the Indonesian film Perempuan Berkalung Sorban, together with the song Batas Asaku. At the bridge of this song, Siti Nurhaliza using her falsetto ranged at E6, the highest notes of head tone she had done. The album was dedicated in memory of Siti's father, Tarudin Ismail who died on 15 February 2009, seven months before the album's release.

== Track listing ==
The album was created by famous Malaysian and Indonesian composers and writers like Habsah Hassan, Audi Mok and others to suit the spiritual genre.

| No. | Title | Lyrics | Music | Length |
|---|---|---|---|---|
| 1. | "Asma Ul Husna" | Erma Fatima | Erma Fatima | 6:00 |
| 2. | "Pintu Rindu" | Hairul Anuar Harun | Hairul Anuar Harun | 4:58 |
| 3. | "Tahajjud Cinta" | Hairul Anuar Harun | Erma Fatima | 5:12 |
| 4. | "Batasku Asaku" | Attan Hardilas | Dato' Siti Nurhaliza | 4:10 |
| 5. | "Ku Percaya Ada Cinta" | Habsah Hassan | Audi Mok | 4:36 |
| 6. | "Ya Rasulullah" | Abu Bakar Mohd Yatim | Abu Bakar Mohd Yatim | 4:55 |
| 7. | "Ketika Cinta" | Opick | Opick | 4:03 |
| 8. | "Selawat" | | | 4:43 |
