= ManifestaSITI2020 =

Studio album by Siti Nurhaliza
- Released: 3 July 2020
- Recorded: 2018 – 2020
- Genres: Pop; R&B
- Length: 40:27
- Labels: SNP; Universal Music Malaysia
- Producers: Dato' Sri Siti Nurhaliza; Kenny Ong; Aubrey Suwito; Ezra Kong; Hafiz Hamidun; Ippo Hafiz; Luca Sickta; Genervie Kam; John Jeevasingham; Omar K; Pown Hasril; Ryan Kyoto

Siti Nurhaliza chronology
SimetriSiti (2017)	ManifestaSITI2020 (2020)	Legasi (2021)

Singles from ManifestaSITI2020
- 1. "Anta Permana" Released: 21 September 2018; 2. "Kasihku Selamanya" Released: 10 July 2019; 3. "Terang" Released: 31 October 2019; 4. "7 Nasihat" Released: 20 February 2020; 5. "Basyirah" Released: 5 May 2020; 6. "Aku Bidadari Syurgamu" Released: 7 July 2020; 7. "Siapa Tak Mahu" Released: 16 October 2020; 8. "Kuasa Cintamu" Released: 1 December 2020; 9. "Takhta Dunia" Released: 8 January 2021

ManifestaSITI2020 (lit. 'Manifestation 2020') is the nineteenth studio album and eighteenth Malay-language album by Malaysian singer, Siti Nurhaliza. It was released by Universal Music Malaysia and her own Siti Nurhaliza Productions on 3 July 2020. Recorded between 2018 and 2020, the album was a collaboration between Malaysian and Indonesian composers, lyricists, and producers, just like the previous album.

The album contains 11 songs, nine of which were released as singles. Pre-orders for the album opened on 28 June and sold 2,000 units.

== Background ==
ManifestaSITI2020 is Siti's nineteenth studio album. She announced the title of her latest album on her social media pages. According to Siti's manager, Rozi Abdul Razak, the concept of the album ManifestaSITI2020 does not shy away from the pop genre which is synonymous with Siti Nurhaliza. The album is Siti's interpretation of her career journey towards 2020.[3] In an interview with Astro Awani, she said: "For this album, we still maintain the pop concept but there will be an old song that will be given a new lease of life. This is Siti Nurhaliza's own manifestation, what she wants, what she wants to express, what she wants to express, so this album is the entire manifestation for 2020,".

A total of 11 songs are included in this album, of which nine were released as singles, namely "Anta Permana", "Kasihku Selamanya", "Terang", "7 Nasihat", "Basyirah", "Aku Bidadari Syurgamu", "Siapa Tak Mahu", "Kuasa Cintamu" and "Takhta Dunia". This album also contains the song "Teratai Menjelma" originally sung by the late Sudirman. Among the staff of this album are Aubrey Suwito, Omar K, Hael Husaini, Ezra Kong, Pown Hasril, Melly Goeslaw, Hafiz Hamidun, Ippo Hafiz, John Jeevasingham, Ryan Kyoto, Kmy Kmo and many others.

This album took half a year to complete. In an interview with Harian Metro, Siti said: "This full album is my determination and continuation to continue because this is the satisfaction of a singer. Alhamdulillah, my company, Siti Nurhaliza Productions has collaborated again with Universal Music Malaysia to release a new album,".

One of the songs in ManifestaSITI2020, "Kuaasa Cintamu" composed by Melly Goeslaw which has a personal touch for her daughter, Siti Aafiyah Khalid. In the song, she expressed all her feelings and emotions throughout her wait to await Aafiyah's arrival. Ippo Hafiz contributed his song, "Aku Bidadari Syurgamu" to this album, he said: "Who has never been captivated by hearing Siti's lenggok singing. I have long kept the desire to create a song for her. It finally came true even after almost 10 years of waiting". It became the soundtrack of the drama 7 Hari Mencintaiku 2.

== Artwork ==
The cover of the ManifestaSITI2020 album shows Siti Nurhaliza wearing a mustard-colored dress and set against a backdrop of buildings in the capital symbolizing freedom. Unlike her previous albums, Siti chose to shoot outside the studio because she wanted something that looked free. She described the cover of this album as more of a lifestyle concept.

== Release and promotion ==
Before its official release, ManifestaSITI2020 sold out 2,000 units the day after pre-orders opened. This number was for pre-orders for the first release and for the second release to be opened. According to Siti: "We are also confident that with the presence of SNP Affiliates or SNP agents selling this album, the sales figures will increase over time because pre-order purchases are also encouraging,".

ManifestaSITI2020 was originally scheduled for release in April 2020, in conjunction with the 25th anniversary of Siti's musical career, but was postponed due to the implementation of the movement control order (MCO) following the COVID-19 pandemic. The album was officially launched on 3 July 2020, at The Sphere, Bangsar South, Bangsar, Kuala Lumpur. At the launch of her latest album, Siti also announced that the music video for "7 Nasihat", a duet with Kmy Kmo and Luca Sickta, would be released on her official YouTube channel on 7 July 2020.

To promote the album, an interactive concert known as the Siti Nurhaliza x HotKool Manifestation was held virtually on 21 August 2020.

== Reception ==
As of October 2020, ManifestaSITI2020 had sold 5,000 units and had received a Gold certification.

Writing for Malaysiakini, Hania Rafei described ManifestaSITI2020 as "present as a physical and digital copy that the author considers relevant despite the current ups and downs of the music and print industries".

== Track listing ==
No.	Title	Writer(s)	Lyrics	Length
1.	"Siapa Tak Mahu"	John Jeevasingham, Omar K, Ikhwan Fatanna	John Jeevasingham, Omar K	2:59
2.	"Aku Bidadari Syurgamu"	Ippo Hafiz, Siti Rosmizah	Ippo Hafiz	3:55
3.	"Kasihku Selamanya"	Aubrey Suwito, Ad Samad	Aubrey Suwito	4:24
4.	"Tertulis Nama Kita"	Siti Nurhaliza, Rozisangdewi	Genervie Kam	3:27
5.	"7 Nasihat" (featuring Kmy Kmo and Luca Sickta)	Kmy Kmo, Luca Sickta	Luca Sickta	3:40
6.	"Kuasa Cintamu"	Melly Goeslaw, Siti Nurhaliza	Aubrey Suwito	4:07
7.	"Takhta Dunia"	Ryan Kyoto	Ryan Kyoto	3:15
8.	"Teratai Menjelma" (Sudirman cover)	Raja Kobat	Pown Hasril	3:44
9.	"Basyirah"	Hafiz Hamidun, Ahmad Fedtri Yahya	Hafiz Hamidun	3:31
10.	"Terang"	Aubrey Suwito, Shah Shamshiri	Aubrey Suwito	3:53
11.	"Anta Permana" (Bonus track)	Ezra Kong, Hael Husaini	Ezra Kong	3:40
Total length:				40:27

== Certification ==
Country	Certification	Sales/Shipments
Malaysia	Gold	5,000

== Release history ==
Region	Release date	Format	Label
Malaysia	3 July 2020	CD, digital download	Siti Nurhaliza Productions, Universal Music Group
