= Kopratasa =

Malaysian music trio

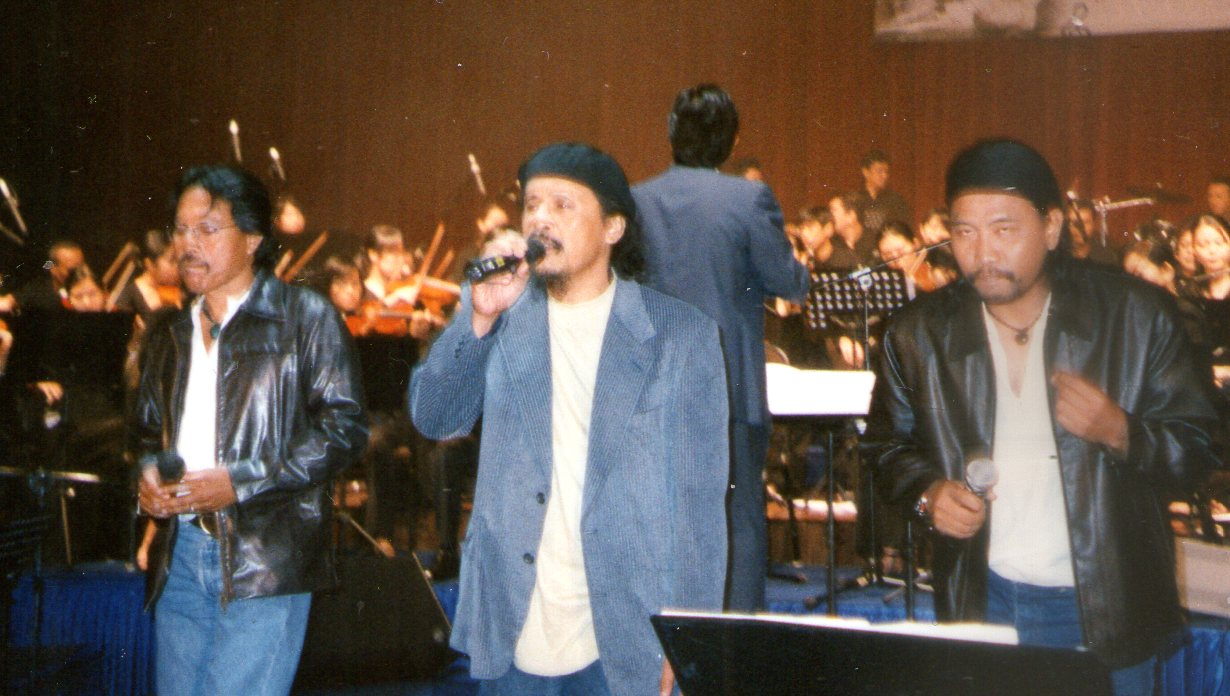
- Kopratasa at a concert at the University of Malaya, Kuala Lumpur, 2010

Background information
- Origin: Kuala Lumpur, Malaysia
- Years active: 1985 – present
- Members: Sani Sudin, Usop (Mohd. Yusof Ahmad), Siso (Syed Indra Syed Omar)

Kopratasa is a male vocal trio in Malaysia, established in 1985. Members of the group are Sani Sudin, Usop (Mohd. Yusof Ahmad), Siso (Syed Indra Syed Omar). One of the initiators of the creation of the group was the playwright Dinsman. They perform their own songs with the lyrics based on the poetry of the popular Malay poets (Usman Awang, A. Samad Said, J. M. Aziz, Abdul Aziz H. M., Latiff Mohidin, Siti Zaleha Hashim, T. Alias Taib, Khalid Salleh and others.).

The first songs were influenced by the Malaysian veteran singer M. Nasir, who helped the group to produce the first discs. Altogether the group released more than 10 albums. The signature of the group is the song “Do you still remember?” (Malay: Masihkah kau ingat), written by Sani Sudin. Sani Sudin and Usop also have solo albums - Sani: “Coffee and Bread” (1993) and “In the Jungle Works” (1997); Usop: "Towards Eternity" (1990).

The group was inactive in 1989–1996. In 1997, it announced its dissolution, but a year later was reunited. However, the latest album, released under the name of Kopratasa in 2016 “Kopratasa - 'Mathnavi' Rumi” contains songs performed by only two of its members: Sani Sudin and Usop.

== Discography ==
- Surrender to fate (Keringat Dalam Pasrah, 1987)
- Key (Kunci, 1988)
- Episode 3 (Episod 3, 1989)
- Night fidelity (Sesetia Malam, 1996)
- Pleasure (Nikmat, 1997)
- Anthology (Antologi, 1998).
- Best Of Kopratasa (2001)
- Nobility (Mulia, 2003)
- Kopratasa is still threesome ... and toothy "(Kopratasa Masih Bertiga ... Tetap Berbisa, 2006)
- Kopratasa, 'Mathnawi' Rumi (2016)

== Awards ==
- The song “Dondang Mustik” (The Jewel Song) was included in the short list at the contest for the best song of the year 2000 conducted by the TV-3 company.

== See also ==
- KOPRATASA. Masih kah kau ingat (1987)
