= S. Atan =

Malaysian composer (1949–2024)

Datuk S. Atan
- Born: Hashim Said; 1 August 1949; Geylang Serai, Singapore
- Died: 16 November 2024 (aged 75) Selangor, Malaysia
- Occupations: Composer, songwriter
- Years active: 1972–2024

Hashim Said (1 August 1949 – 16 November 2024), known professionally as S. Atan, was a Singaporean music composer.

== Life and career ==
Atan was raised in Singapore, where he lived in a kampung in the Malay settlement of Geylang Serai. As a child, he was taught by his uncle to play accordion and bongo drums. While attending the local Chinese-language school, Happy Garden, he served as a member of the school's music club.

Atan entered the music industry in 1972. During his career, he was reported to have written more than 1,000 songs. He wrote for artists such as Jamal Abdillah, Siti Nurhaliza, and Sudirman.

Atan died in Selangor, Malaysia on 16 November 2024, at the age of 75. His death followed a recent hospitalisation due to a lung infection.
