= Siti Nurhaliza in Symphony =

- Concert by Siti Nurhaliza
- Location: Kuala Lumpur, Malaysia
- Venue: Petronas Philharmonic Hall
- Associated album: Siti Nurhaliza I, Cindai, Adiwarna, Pancawarna, Sahmura, Sanggar Mustika, E.M.A.S, Prasasti Seni, Transkripsi, Lentera Timur and CTKD: Canda, Tangis, Ketawa, Duka.
- Date: 5–7 July 2013
- No. of shows: 3

Siti Nurhaliza concert chronology
- Siti Nurhaliza Live in Kuantan (2012); Siti Nurhaliza in Symphony (2013); Konsert Lentera Timur (2013)

Siti Nurhaliza In Symphony – Live With The Malaysian Philharmonic Orchestra (or simply Siti Nurhaliza in Symphony) was a concert by Malaysian recording artist, Siti Nurhaliza. Held on three consecutive nights in July 2013 at Petronas Philharmonic Hall, this was her first solo concert to be backed entirely by 80-piece Malaysian Philharmonic Orchestra (MPO). The concert marked her 18th year involvement Malaysian music industry with more than 20 albums, where most songs that were performed were taken from her solo albums and couple of songs as tribute to Malaysian singers and artists who have inspired her.

During the course of the three-night concert, she performed more than 20 songs with MPO which was also her second time collaborating with them since 2001, when she was only a guest artist for Tan Sri SM Salim.

== Background and development ==
"It was really hard to pick the songs for this performance. At first, I have listed over 30 songs, but after much deliberation with the conductor and music coordinator, we have decided on 20 best songs that are suitable with orchestral arrangement."

— Siti Nurhaliza in Siti Nurhaliza in Symphony, (First night of the performance) (Note: Original:"Memang susah untuk memilih lagu bagi persembahan kali ini. Pada awalnya, saya menyenaraikan lebih 30 lagu, tetapi selepas duduk berbincang dengan konduktor dan penyusun muzik, kami memutuskan untuk 20 lagu terbaik yang sesuai dengan pembawaan orkestra.")

She was reportedly invited to collaborate with Malaysian Philharmonic Orchestra (MPO) as early as July 2012. This concert marked her first collaboration with MPO as a solo artist at Petronas Philharmonic Hall (DFP). 12 years earlier, in 2001, at the very same venue, she was only a guest artist for Tan Sri SM Salim's concert which also was backed by MPO, Konsert Perjalanan Seni Tan Sri SM Salim. During the stint, she only performed two songs – Mohon Kasih as a solo and Pandang Pandang Jeling Jeling as a duet.

Prior to the concert dates, the preparation for the concert for Siti herself has taken place at least a month earlier. Preparation made by Siti included the training for her voice, breath control and stamina against a prerecorded orchestral arrangement of the chosen songs made by MPO in a compact disc, followed by a couple of morning and evening practice sessions with MPO itself for two days in a row before the concert dates, under the tutelage and guidance of Kevin Field, the conductor for the concert. Siti admitted the fact that though she has had performed at Royal Albert Hall with London Symphony Orchestra in 2005, and had been a recording artist for over 18 years, it was still a challenge for her to perform a full orchestra-backed performance. In the first night of the performance, she said, "Every time after I finished singing a song, I will feel relieved. It is not easy to make sure that we and the musicians are moving together. Alhamdullilah (Praise to God), so far I am satisfied, because I got the momentum that I wanted." (Note: Original:"Setiap kali selesai menyanyikan sebuah lagu, saya akan rasa lega. Bukan mudah untuk memastikan kita dan pemuzik orkestra berjalan serentak. Alhamdulillah, setakat ini saya berpuas hati kerana mendapat momentum yang saya inginkan")

In addition to limited time frame for practice, Farihad Shalla Mahmud of Berita Harian also pointed out that unlike her previous concerts with considerable big space that allows different gimmicks to be performed, the limited space at DFP means Siti has nothing to offer other than her solid vocal performance alone. Since the whole duration of the concert was only 90 minutes, the original 30 songs that she has listed to perform has to be reduced to only 20 songs, composed mainly from her own repertoire, with additional songs from singers who have inspired her to be in the music industry – Alleycats, Jamal Abdillah, M. Nasir, Sudirman Arshad and P. Ramlee.

The concert also marked the closing of DFP and MPO's 2012/2013 season. To maintain the exclusivity of the concert, no form of audio or visual recordings were made upon Siti's own request. She said, "This is my own request and may it become the sweetest memory for the audiences for the next ten, twenty years". (Note: Original:"Ini memang kehendak Siti dan moga ia menjadi kenangan terindah buat penonton untuk sepuluh, dua puluh tahun akan datang")

== Performances ==
=== Fashion and stage ===
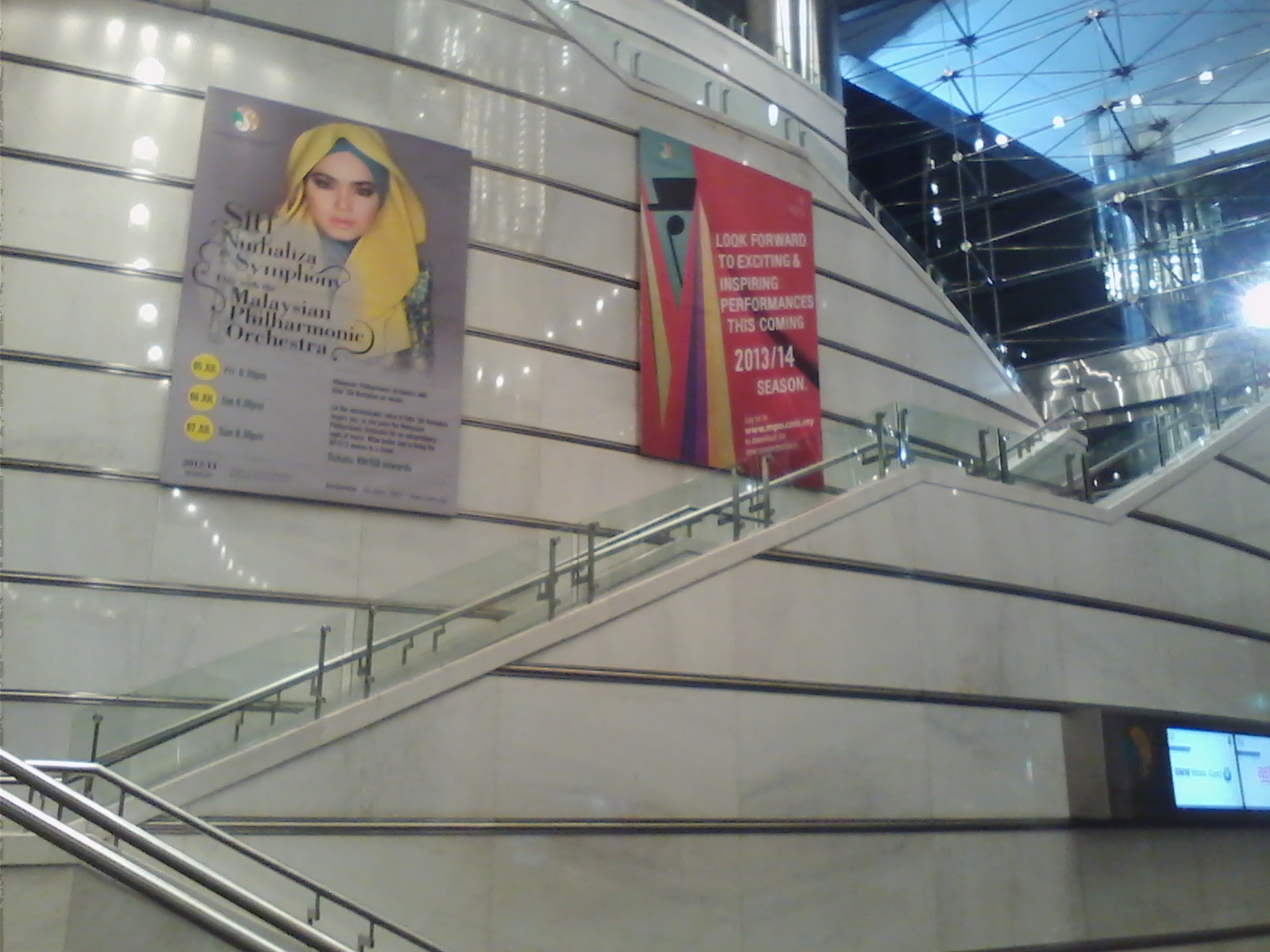
One of the pathways that leads to the entrance of the concert at Petronas Philharmonic Hall.

In the course of 3 days of the concert, she only changed her dress twice per each night of the concert, and the dresses were all designed by three local designers – Khoon Hooi, Cosry and Rizman Ruzaini. Her choice of dress to be worn especially for the debut night of the concert received positive feedbacks from the reviewers where both Azhariah Kamin of The Star and Nur Aqidah Azizi of New Straits Times said Siti looked "resplendent" in a turquoise coloured dress designed by Khoon Hooi. Given the limited space of stage for her to perform, most of the focus of the concert was her vocals. Apart from her performing space, much of the space on stage was taken by the 80-piece Malaysian Philharmonic Orchestra musicians, and the conductor, Kevin Field.

=== Concert synopsis ===
The concert opened with Siti performing "Kau Kekasihku", one of her singles from her album, Pancawarna which then was followed by traditional number, "Badarsila" which was taken from her eight album, Sanggar Mustika. Then, it was followed by the first medley of the concert which was basically a string of her well-known ballads like "Jerat Percintaan", "Bukan Cinta Biasa", "Diari Hatimu" and "Percayalah". Siti admitted that ballad is the most challenging song genre that she had to perform. One of the comments that she made after performing the medley of ballads was, "Wow! What a relief! "Seriously I was thinking, ‘Will I be able to pull this one off?’ Thank God I did." She also commented, "Ballad really challenges my vocals' durability because it requires [me to take] long breath [to perform it]. To make sure that I have enough stamina, every day I will jog for an hour". (Note: Original:"Lagu balada memang menguji ketahanan vokal saya kerana memerlukan nafas panjang. Untuk memastikan stamina cukup, setiap hari saya joging selama sejam.") Still in the first part of the concert, she later performed as a tribute, two songs that were made famous by Tan Sri P. Ramlee – "Malam Bulan Dipagar Bintang" and "Tiada Kata Secantik Bahasa". Explaining her decision to choose the two songs, she explained, "Picking songs by Tan Sri P. Ramlee as a tribute to the legend was not easy for me. There are just too many great songs that he had written. Tonight’s songs were chosen because of their beautiful melodies and lyrics." Closing the first part of the concert, she performed four songs which were all taken from four different album of hers – "Hanya Dia" (CTKD: Canda, Tangis, Ketawa, Duka), "Di Taman Teman" (Lentera Timur), "Seindah Biasa" (Prasasti Seni) dan "Biarlah Rahsia" (Transkripsi).

In the second part of the concert, she began the performance with "Cindai" while playing Darbuka. Speaking of the idea in playing Darbuka as part of her performance, she commented during the media conference, "The idea of playing a drum has been thought by me for quite awhile. The funny thing is, since I was so busy with singing and dancing practices, I had to practice playing the Darbuka while I was about to sleep. Whether [he likes it] or not, my husband (Datuk Khalid) has to bear with it." (Note: Original:"Idea untuk memukul gendang ini memang sudah lama Siti fikirkan. Lucunya, disebabkan Siti sibuk dengan latihan nyanyian dan tarian, Siti terpaksa berlatih memukul Darbuka ini sewaktu hendak tidur. Mahu tak mahu, suami Siti (Datuk K) terpaksalah mendengarnya.") In the next part of the show, she presented another tribute song to her idols, and this time for Alleycats, M. Nasir and Jamal Abdillah, by singing "Senandung Semalam" which was made famous by the three artists. Later, "Lebih Indah" was performed for the first time ever by her. A new song, which was said to reflect her emotional state when her husband was involved in a motorcycle accident in New Zealand in 2012. The concert later continued with the final medley of the night, which was composed of her more upbeat songs like "Ku Mahu", "Balqis" and "Ya Maulai". The final tribute song of the concert, "Terasing" which was an homage to Sudirman Arshad was performed to close the aforementioned upbeat numbers. Another song, which was included in the set list was "Purnama Merindu", one of the songs that has helped her to promote her name to the international stage. Closing the ceremony, performed as an encore was "Muara Hati", which was well received by members of the audience before the concert drew to its end.

== Critical response ==
"[...] I must admit that the singer from Pahang gave an almost flawless performance. From her opening song, "Kau Kekasihku", to the encore, "Muara Hati", Siti kept her audience entertained. The range in her voice was amazing. After having been singing in the industry for the last two decades, Siti has shown that, like wine, her voice only gets better with time. Some singers have the tendency to scream just to show off their powerful vocals. In the process, the songs get distorted. Siti, however, showed good control of her vocals. And she knew exactly how to modulate her voice accordingly with effortless precision."

— Bissme S., The Sun

Overall, the concert received positive reviews and feedback from music critics, especially for Siti's vocal showcase. A number of the reviews agree that she indeed possessed the "buluh perindu" (very sweet voice) quality to her vocals, while others praised that she has certain "magical" quality to both her vocals and performances. Most of the critics praised her ability to sing technical ballads with ease. Nur Aqidah Azizi of New Straits Times on the opening song of the night, "Kau Kekasihku" one of the ballads in the set list commented, "It was, perhaps, one of the most difficult songs in Siti’s repertoire but she certainly outdid herself that night, performing the high notes effortlessly." Azhariah Kamin of The Star also commented positively on "Kau Kekasihku" as the opening performance. She commented, "Backed by an 80-piece MPO ensemble and watched by a hushed audience, there was no way that Siti could go wrong with this infectious ballad. The song, which is about love lost, showcased Siti’s vocal prowess as the chorus was sung on the upper register. And as expected, Siti sang the poignant song beautifully. What a start it was at DFP!" Syazwan Zakariah of Astro Awani also praised Siti's vocal ability to sing ballads with ease. He commented that, "Siti appeared very calm, in fact [she seemed] relax, it is as if she was smiling every time she is singing, though while performing difficult song like "Purnama Merindu"." (Note: Original:"Siti kelihatan sangat tenang, malah seperti biasa, dia seakan tersenyum setiap kali menyanyi, walaupun pada lagu yang sukar seperti "Purnama Merindu".")

Her ability to sing traditional songs were also subject of praise by the critics, in particular, "Badarsila" which is one of the songs from her eight album, Sanggar Mustika. Kamaruddin Razal, a reviewer from Gua.com.my praised such ability by saying,"The mellowness and melisma of her vocals in phrasing the melody and the rhythm of this traditional song can't no longer be denied." (Note: Original:"Lunak dan lenggok suara Siti dalam mengalunkan melodi dan irama tradisional ini tidak dapat dinafikan lagi kehebatannya.") Nur Aqidah Azizi of New Straits Times also shared the same sentiment. She commented that Siti has "made it look as if little effort was needed to bring such beautiful performance to the song".

In another aspect of the concert, during the second part of the concert, Nur Aqidah Azizi commented her only negative remark of the concert is how certain part of the second half of the show "... could sound even better without the drums set and its annoying cymbals, that unceremoniously overpowered the string section." Bissme S. of The Sun noted that despite Siti's jokes and banters can be "too simplistic", he believed that, in the eyes of the fans, "Siti can do no wrong." Azhariah Kamin noted that these jokes actually "brought the artiste and audience closer to each other."

The 3-day concert, in overall, received positive reviews and responses from the music and concert critics alike. Syazawan Zakariah concluded his review by saying, "Though she was backed by musicians as impressive as the MPO, Siti's vocals was the best "instrument" of the night. With clear voice, energetic and dynamic, she has proven that she is still nation's best vocalist.", (Note: Original:"Walaupun diiringi pemuzik sehebat MPO, suara Siti adalah ‘instrumen’ terbaik pada malam itu. Dengan vokal yang jelas, bertenaga dan dinamik, dia membuktikan bahawa dia masih antara penyanyi terunggul negara.") while Nur Aqidah Azizi concluded hers on Siti's vocal showcase with "to describe her as the singer with a golden voice would really be an understatement."

== Commercial performance ==
Tickets for the concert were made available since late April 2013 through its official ticket vendors, dfp.com.my and mpo.com.my. Listed from RM 150 to RM 400, it was reported that by May, more than 90 percents of the tickets have already been sold. With Petronas Philharmonic Hall at its full capacity able to seat 900 people per night, all 2700 tickets that were available sold out weeks after the concert was announced.

== Set list ==
1. "Kau Kekasihku" (Musical Arrangement by Jenny Chin)
2. "Badarsila" (Musical Arrangement by Jenny Chin)
3. First Medley (Musical Arrangement by Ahmad Muriz Che Ros)
  1. "Jerat Percintaan"
  2. "Bukan Cinta Biasa"
  3. "Diari Hatimu"
  4. "Percayalah"
4. Medley P. Ramlee (Musical Arrangement by Ahmad Muriz Che Ros)
  1. "Malam Bulan Dipagar Bintang"
  2. "Tiada Kata Secantik Bahasa"
5. "Hanya Dia" (Musical Arrangement by Khor Chin Yang)
6. "Di Taman Teman" (Musical Arrangement by Jenny Chin)
7. "Biarlah Rahsia" (Musical Arrangement by Yuzaifullah Mohd. Yusof)
8. "Seindah Biasa" (Musical Arrangement by Syed Sharir Faisal Syed Hussain)
9. "Cindai" (Musical Arrangement by Syed Sharir Faisal Syed Hussain)
10. "Senandung Semalam" (Musical Arrangement by Syed Sharir Faisal Syed Hussain)
11. "Lebih Indah" (Musical Arrangement by Jenny Chin)
12. Second Medley (Musical Arrangement by Yuzaifullah Mohd. Yusof)
  1. "Ku Mahu"
  2. "Balqis"
  3. "Ya Maulai"
13. "Terasing" (Musical Arrangement by Yuzaifullah Mohd. Yusof)
14. "Purnama Merindu" (Musical Arrangement by Ahmad Muriz Che Ros)

Source: Adapted from concert's tour program's liner notes.

Additional note

- Though it was not in the program booklet, "Muara Hati" was added to the set list and performed as an encore.

== Personnel ==
Vocals

- Siti Nurhaliza

Music Director

- Claus Peter Flor

Associate Conductor

- Kevin Field

First Violin

- Anna Reszniak - Concertmaster
- Peter Daniš - Co-Concertmaster
- Ming Goh - Principal
- Zhenzhen Liang - Co-Principal
- Vira Nyezhentseva - Sub-Principal
- Runa Baagöe
- Maho Daniš
- Miroslav Daniš
- Evgeny Kaplan
- Ergys Koni
- Martijn Noomen
- Sherwin Tia

Second Violin

- Daniela Rodnite - Section Principal
- Timothy Peters - Co-Principal
- Luisa Hyams - Assistant Principal
- Graeme Norris - Sub-Principal
- Catalina Alvarez
- Chia-Nan Hung
- Anastasia Kiseleva
- Stefan Kocsis
- Ling Yunzhi
- Ionut Mazareanu
- Tan Poh Kim
- Christine Yu
- Yanbo Zhao

Viola

- Jin Zhenhong - Section Principal
- Gábor Mokány - Co-Principal
- Fumiko Dobrinov
- Linda Garrett
- Ong Lin Kern
- Carol Pendlebury
- Sun Yuan
- Fan Ran

Cello

- Csaba Kőrös - Co-Principal
- Steven Retallick - Assistant Principal
- Gerald Davis
- Julie Dessureault
- Laurentiu Gherman
- Tan Poh Joo
- Elizabeth Tan Suyin
- Sejla Simon

Double Bass

- Wolfgang Steike - Section Principal
- Christopher Brandt - Co-Principal
- Joseph Pruessner - Assistant Principal
- Raffael Bietenhader
- Jun-Hee Chae
- Naohisa Furusawa
- John Kennedy
- Foo Yin Hong

Flute

- Hristo Dobrinov - Section Principal
- Yukako Yamamoto - Co-Principal
- Rachel Jenkyns - Sub-Principal

Piccolo

- Sonia Croucher - Principal

Oboe

- Simon Emes - Section Principal
- Joost Flach - Co-Principal
- Niels Dittman - Sub-Principal

Cor Anglais

- Denis Simonnet - Principal

Clarinet

- Matthew Larsen - Sub-Principal

Bass Clarinet

- Chris Bosco - Principal

Bassoon

- Alexander Lenkov - Section Principal
- Jasen Atansov - Co-Principal

Contrabassoon

- Vladimir Stoyanov

Horn

- Zora Slokar - Section Principal
- James Schumacher - Co-Principal
- Laurence Davies - Sub-Principal
- Tan Chai Suang - Sub-Principal*
- Sim Chee Ghee - Assistant Principal

Trumpet

- William Theis - Co-Principal
- William Day - Sub-Principal
- John Bourque - Assistant Principal

Trombone

- Marques Young - Co-Principal
- Michael Massong - Co-Principal*
- Anthony Wise - Sub-Principal

Bass trombone

- Zachary Bond - Principal

Tuba

- Brett Stemple - Section Principal

Timpani

- Owain Williams - Section Principal*

Percussion

- Matthew Prendergast - Section Principal
- Shaun Tilburg - Sub-Principal*
- Erick Renick - Sub-Principal*

Traditional Percussion

- Abdullah Omar*
- Mohd Khairul Anuar*

Harp

- Tan Keng Hong - Principal

Piano

- Nicholas Ong*
- Jenny Chin*

Additional Notes

- (*) Substitute or extra musician.
- Sectional string players are listed alphabetically and rotate within their sections.

Source: Adapted from concert's tour program's liner notes.
