= Siti Nurhaliza discography =

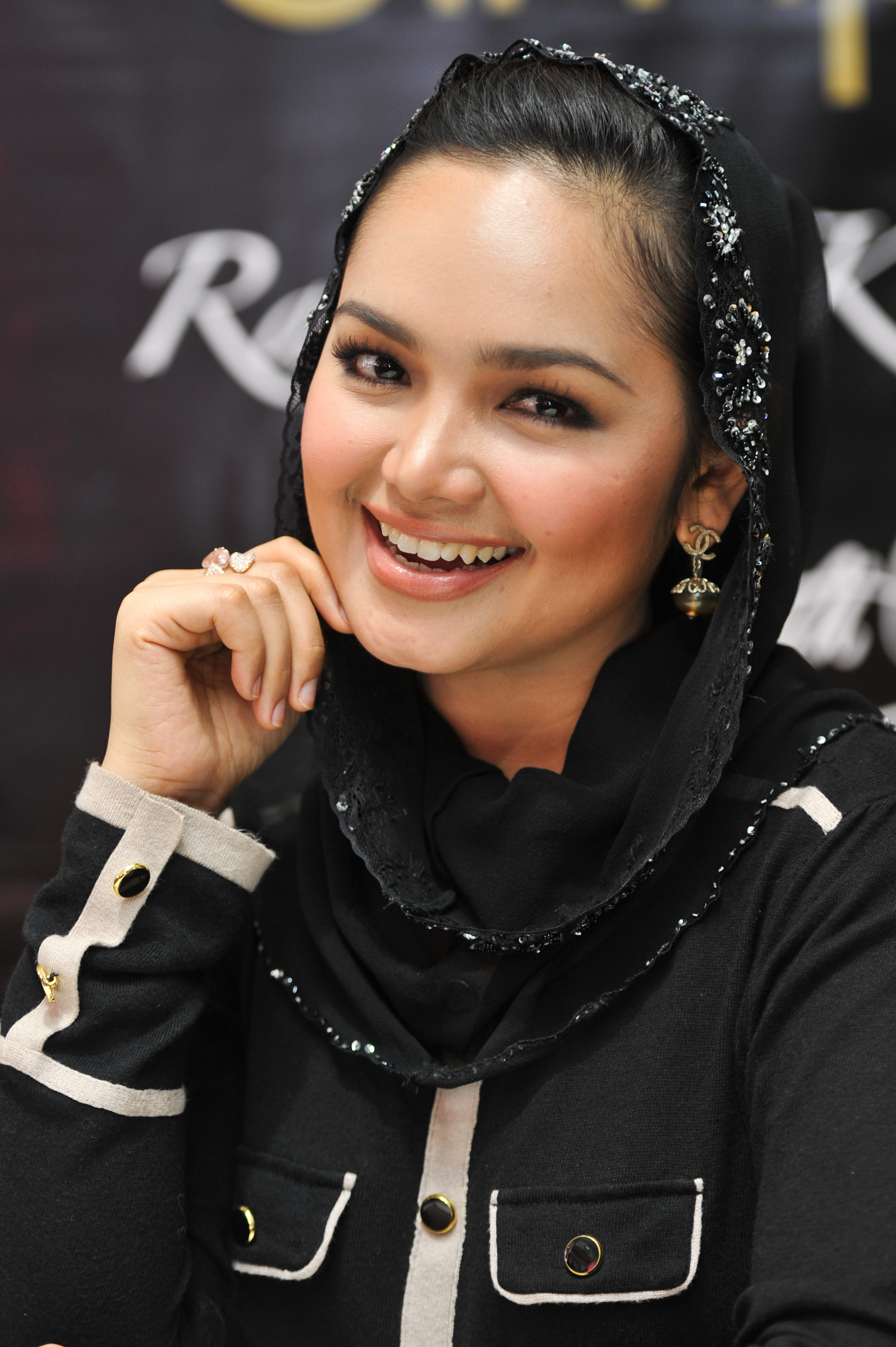
- Siti Nurhaliza in 2011
- Studio albums: 20
- Singles: 52
- Music videos: 70
- Special album: 1
- Duet albums: 2
- Compilation albums: 9
- Live albums: 11

Malaysian singer Siti Nurhaliza has sold an estimated six million records throughout Asia during her career. Within five years, the sales for her first six albums have already reached 1 million units in the Malaysian market and another 500,000 units from the Indonesian market. Her debut album was revealed to sold more than 800,000 copies and eight out of 15 of her solo albums have received either gold, platinum or multiple platinum certifications in Malaysia and Indonesia.

In 2000, her album sales alone contributed to 10 percent of Malaysia's total album sales. To date, her discography consists of 20 solo studio albums, 1 Special album, 2 duet albums, 11 live albums, 9 compilation albums with more than 300 songs and singles. She has also released 70 music videos.

== Albums ==
=== Studio albums ===
Title	Album details	Peak chart positions	Sales	Certifications
Title	Album details	RIM	Sales	Certifications
Siti Nurhaliza	Released: 1 April 1996; Formats: CD, cassette, LP record; Label: Suria Records	8	MLY: 800,000	
Siti Nurhaliza II	Released: 27 January 1997; Formats: CD, cassette, VCD, LP record; Label: Suria Records	2	MLY: 400,000; IDN: 500,000	RIM: 6× Platinum
Cindai	Released: 17 November 1997; Formats: CD, cassette, VCD, DVD, LP record; Label: Suria Records	1	MLY: 400,000; IDN: 100,000	RIM: 5× Platinum
Adiwarna	Released: 29 June 1998; Formats: CD, VCD, cassette; Label: Suria Records	1	MLY: 200,000 (Note: For an album that was released before 2003, it has to surpass sales of 50,000 copies to receive a platinum certification.); IDN: 300,000	RIM: 4× Platinum
Pancawarna	Released: 7 May 1999; Formats: CD, cassette; Label: Suria Records	1	MLY: 100,000	RIM: 2× Platinum
Sahmura	Released: 1 January 2000; Formats: CD, cassette; Label: Suria Records	1	MLY: 100,000	RIM: 2× Platinum
Safa	Released: 11 January 2001; Formats: CD, VCD, DVD, cassette; Label: Suria Records	2	MLY: 80,877	
Sanggar Mustika	Released: 10 March 2002; Formats: CD, cassette; Label: Suria Records	1	IDN: 75,000	ASIRI: Gold
E.M.A.S	Released: 3 March 2003; Formats: CD, cassette; Label: Suria Records	—	MLY: 200,000; IDN: 300,000	RIM: 2× Platinum; ASIRI: Platinum
Prasasti Seni	Released: 12 April 2004; Formats: CD, cassette; Label: Suria Records	—	MLY: 100,000; IDN: 700,000	
Transkripsi	Released: 23 April 2006; Formats: CD, cassette; Label: Siti Nurhaliza Productions	1	MLY: 80,000	RIM: 4× Platinum
Hadiah Daripada Hati	Released: 10 December 2007; Formats: CD, cassette, digital download; Label: Siti Nurhaliza Productions	—	MLY: 35,000	
Lentera Timur	Released: 26 December 2008; Formats: CD, digital download; Label: Siti Nurhaliza Productions	—	MLY: 40,000	
Tahajjud Cinta	Released: 9 September 2009; Formats: CD, digital download; Label: Siti Nurhaliza Productions	—	MLY: 10,000	
All Your Love	Released: 16 September 2011; Formats: CD, digital download; Label: Siti Nurhaliza Productions, What's Up Entertainment, Warner Music	—	MLY: 70,000	
Fragmen	Released: 30 June 2014; Formats: CD, digital download; Label: Siti Nurhaliza Productions, Universal Music Malaysia	—	MLY: 50,000	RIM: 3× Platinum
SimetriSiti	Released: 10 May 2017; Formats: CD, digital download; Label: Siti Nurhaliza Productions, Universal Music Malaysia	—	MLY: 5,300	RIM: Gold
ManifestaSITI2020	Released: 3 July 2020; Formats: CD, Boxset, digital download; Label: Siti Nurhaliza Productions, Universal Music Malaysia	—	MLY: 5,000	RIM: Gold
Legasi	Released: 1 April 2021; Formats: CD, Boxset, digital download; Label: Siti Nurhaliza Productions	—		
Sitism	Released: 30 June 2023; Formats: Digital download; Label: Siti Nurhaliza Productions, Universal Music Malaysia	—		
Gema Bumantara	Released: 28 October 2025; Formats: Digital download; Label: Siti Nurhaliza Productions, SN Legacy, Universal Music Malaysia	—		
"—" denotes albums which did not chart or the chart ceased to be available.

=== Special album ===
Year	Title	Sales	Certifications
Anugerah Aidilfitri	Released: 10 December 2003; Formats: CD, cassette, VCD, DVD; Label: Suria Records	IDN: 50,000	ASIRI: Platinum

=== Collaborative albums ===
Title	Album details	Peak chart position	Sales
Title	Album details	RIM	Sales
Seri Balas (with Noraniza Idris)	Released: 11 January 1999; Formats: CD, cassette; Label: Suria Records	1	MLY: 100,000
CTKD (duet album with Krisdayanti)	Released: 28 December 2009; Formats: CD; Label: Suria Records, Siti Nurhaliza Productions	—	IDN: 10,000

=== Live albums ===
Title	Album details	Peak chart position	Sales	Certifications
Title	Album details	RIM	Sales	Certifications
Konsert Live Siti Nurhaliza	Released: 1999; Formats: VCD, CD; Label: Suria Records	4		
Konsert Mega Siti Nurhaliza, Bukit Jalil 2001	Released: 2001; Format: VCD, CD; Label: Suria Records	—		
Konsert Salam Terakhir Siti Nurhaliza – Untukmu Sudir	Released: 2002; Formats: VCD, CD, digital download; Label: Suria Records	—		
Secretaries Week Celebration 2004	Released: 2004; Formats: VCD, CD; Label: Suria Records	—		
Siti Nurhaliza Live In Concert 2004	Released: 2004; Formats: VCD, CD; Label: Suria Records	—		
Siti Nurhaliza In Concert, Royal Albert Hall London	Released: 2005; Formats: DVD, VCD, CD; Label: Suria Records	—	MLY: 60,000	RIM: 3× Platinum
Konsert Akustik Siti Nurhaliza	Released: 2006; Formats: VCD; Label: Berjaya HVN	—		
Konsert Lentera Timur Dato' Siti Nurhaliza	Released: 2014; Formats: CD, VCD, DVD, digital download; Label: Siti Nurhaliza Productions, Universal Music Malaysia	—		
Unplugged	Released: 30 June 2015; Formats: CD, VCD, DVD, LP, digital download; Label: Siti Nurhaliza Productions, EMI Malaysia, Universal Music Malaysia	—	MLY: 5,000	RIM: Gold
Dato' Siti Nurhaliza & Friends Live	Released: 2016; Formats: Digital (Streaming); Label: Yonder Music Malaysia	—		
Konsert Satu Suara, Vol. 2	Released: 2016; Formats: Digital (Download & streaming), DVD; Label: Siti Nurhaliza Productions, Universal Music Malaysia	—		
"—" denotes albums which did not chart or the chart ceased to be available.

=== Compilation albums ===
Solo compilation albums
Title	Album details	Peak chart positions	Sales	Certifications
Title	Album details	RIM	Sales	Certifications
The Best of Siti Nurhaliza	Released: 2000; Formats: CD, cassette, VCD; Label: Suria Records	2	MLY: 60,000; IDN: 75,000	ASIRI: Platinum
Most Award Winning Artiste	Released: 2001; Format: CD, cassette; Label: Suria Records	2		
Cerita Cinta	Released: 2006; Formats: CD, cassette; Label: Suria Records	—		
Klasik	Released: 2007; Formats: CD, cassette; Label: Suria Records	—		
Permata Irama	Released: 2008; Formats: CD; Label: Suria Records	—		
Siti & Friends	Released: 2010; Formats: CD; Label: Suria Records	—		
Pewaris Lagu-Lagu Tradisional	Released: 2012; Formats: CD; Label: Suria Records	—		
"—" denotes albums which did not chart or the chart ceased to be available.

Indonesian solo compilation albums
Title	Album details
Golden Awards - Shanghai Festival 1999-2000 Siti Nurhaliza Purnama Merindu	Released: 1999; Formats: cassette; Label: Blackboard
2000 Lagu-lagu Terbaik Siti Nurhaliza	Released: 2000; Formats: CD, cassette; Label: Blackboard, Suria Records
Best of The Best Siti Nurhaliza AMI Sharp Awards	Released: 2000; Format: cassette; Label: EMI Indonesia, Suria Records
The Best of Siti Nurhaliza Vol. 2	Released: 2004; Formats: CD, cassette; Label: Warner Music Indonesia, Suria Records

Duet/group compilation albums
Title	Album details	Peak chart positions
Title	Album details	RIM
Molek (with Noraniza Idris and Liza Hanim)	Released: 1999; Formats: CD; Label: Suria Records	3
Lebaran Bersama Siti & Teman-Teman (with various artists)	Released: 2008; Formats: CD; Label: Suria Records	—
2 Diva (duet album with Krisdayanti)	Released: 2008; Formats: CD; Label: Suria Records & Warner Music	—
"—" denotes albums which did not chart or the chart ceased to be available.

== Other albums ==
=== Instrumental albums ===
Title	Album details
Siti Nurhaliza Minus One Karaoke	Minus One album; Released: 1997; Formats: CD; Label: Suria Records
Melodi Kristal	Music Box album; Released: 2001; Formats: CD; Label: Suria Records
Melodi Kristal 2	Music Box album; Released: 2002; Formats: CD; Label: Suria Records
Melodi Kristal 3	Music Box album; Released: 2003; Formats: CD; Label: Suria Records

=== Remix album ===
Title	Album details
S.N. House Mix	Released: 2007; Formats: CD; Label: Suria Records

=== Soundtracks ===
Year	Album	Title	Notes
2003	OST Koleksi Terbaik: Various Artists; Released: 2003; Formats: CD; Label: Suria Records	Tetap Di sini	Theme song for movie Paloh.
2003	OST Koleksi Terbaik: Various Artists; Released: 2003; Formats: CD; Label: Suria Records	Untukmu Selamanya	Theme song for movie Laila Isabella.
2003	OST Koleksi Terbaik: Various Artists; Released: 2003; Formats: CD; Label: Suria Records	Air Mata Ibu	Theme song for a telemovie, Air Mata Ibu.
2004	Puteri Gunung Ledang Sound Track: Various Artists; Released: 2004; Formats: CD; Label: Suria Records	Bagaikan Sakti (duet with M. Nasir)	
2007	Kayangan The Soundtrack: Various Artist; Released: 2007; Formats: CD; Label: Maestro Talent	Menanti Pasti	
2008	P. Ramlee The Musical: Various Artist; Released: 2008; Formats: CD + DVD; Label: Enfiniti Vision Media	Mulanya Cinta	This album includes a special CD and DVD for behind the scenes and music videos for two songs from the same album.
"—" denotes albums which did not chart or the chart ceased to be available.

== Other songs ==
Songs from Indonesian version of Siti's albums

Year	Title	Notes
1997	Betapa Ku Cinta Padamu	An Indonesian version of one of her singles, Aku Cinta Padamu, from album Betapa Ku Cinta Padamu, an Indonesian version of her sophomore album, Siti Nurhaliza II.
1998	Menyintaimu Selamanya	An Indonesian version of one of her songs, Sendiri, from album Menyintaimu Selamanya, an Indonesian version of her fourth album, Adiwarna.

Songs/singles from non-solo studio or duet compilation albums

Year	Title	Notes
1999	Hati Kama (duet with Noraniza Idris)	Featured in her very first duet album with Noraniza Idris, Seri Balas.
1999	Ketawa Lagi (duet with Noraniza Idris)	Featured in her very first duet album with Noraniza Idris, Seri Balas.
1999	Walinong Sari	Featured in her very first duet album with Noraniza Idris, Seri Balas.
1999	Musalmah Manis	Featured in her very first duet album with Noraniza Idris, Seri Balas.
1999	Lenggang Lenggok (duet with Noraniza Idris)	Featured in her very first duet album with Noraniza Idris, Seri Balas.
1999	Pulau Pisang	Featured in her very first duet album with Noraniza Idris, Seri Balas.
1999	Dondang Dendang (duet with Noraniza Idris)	Featured in her very first duet album with Noraniza Idris, Seri Balas.
2000	Dalam Taman Syahdu	Featured in her very first compilation album, The Best Of Siti Nurhaliza.
2000	Gelora Kasih	Featured in her very first compilation album, The Best Of Siti Nurhaliza.
2001	Don't Put My Heart On Hold	Featured in her special compilation album commemorating her title as the Most Award Winning Artiste by the Malaysia's Book of Records, The Malaysia Book Of Records: Edisi Istimewa.
2001	We'll Be As One	Featured in her special compilation album commemorating her title as the Most Award Winning Artiste by the Malaysia's Book of Records, The Malaysia Book Of Records: Edisi Istimewa.
2005	Because You Loved Me	Featured in a special album with Samsung, Samsung My World when she was the ambassadress for the brand. This was her second attempt to sing in Mandarin with the debut of two cover of Mandarin songs, 征服 (Zheng Fu) and 月亮代表我的心 (Yue Liang Dai Biao Wo De Xin) which she originally performed live at the 15th Golden Melody Awards in 2004.
2005	征服 (Zheng Fu)	Featured in a special album with Samsung, Samsung My World when she was the ambassadress for the brand. This was her second attempt to sing in Mandarin with the debut of two cover of Mandarin songs, 征服 (Zheng Fu) and 月亮代表我的心 (Yue Liang Dai Biao Wo De Xin) which she originally performed live at the 15th Golden Melody Awards in 2004.
2005	月亮代表我的心 (Yue Liang Dai Biao Wo De Xin)	Featured in a special album with Samsung, Samsung My World when she was the ambassadress for the brand. This was her second attempt to sing in Mandarin with the debut of two cover of Mandarin songs, 征服 (Zheng Fu) and 月亮代表我的心 (Yue Liang Dai Biao Wo De Xin) which she originally performed live at the 15th Golden Melody Awards in 2004.
2006	Cahaya Cinta	Featured in a special album, where it is a gift from Suria Records to Siti Nurhaliza for her wedding.
2007	Jangan Ditanya	Featured in one of her compilation albums composing only traditional songs, Klasik.
2007	Sirih Pinang	Featured in one of her compilation albums composing only traditional songs, Klasik.
2010	Jika Kau Tak Datang (duet with Krisdayanti)	Featured in Siti's second duet album which was a co-operation with Krisdayanti, CTKD: Canda, Tangis, Ketawa, Duka.
2010	Sebagai Teman (duet with Krisdayanti)	Featured in Siti's second duet album which was a co-operation with Krisdayanti, CTKD: Canda, Tangis, Ketawa, Duka.
2010	Amarah (duet with Krisdayanti)	Featured in Siti's second duet album which was a co-operation with Krisdayanti, CTKD: Canda, Tangis, Ketawa, Duka.
2010	Hanya Dia (duet with Krisdayanti)	Featured in Siti's second duet album which was a co-operation with Krisdayanti, CTKD: Canda, Tangis, Ketawa, Duka.
2010	Dalam Diamku (duet with Krisdayanti)	Featured in Siti's second duet album which was a co-operation with Krisdayanti, CTKD: Canda, Tangis, Ketawa, Duka.
2010	Tanpamu (duet with Krisdayanti)	Featured in Siti's second duet album which was a co-operation with Krisdayanti, CTKD: Canda, Tangis, Ketawa, Duka.
2012	Zapin Bernasib	Previously unreleased track, featured in one of her compilation albums composing only traditional songs, Pewaris Lagu-Lagu Tradisional.
2014	Popaleh Weh	Featured in her live albums of traditional concert, Konsert Lentera Timur Dato' Siti Nurhaliza.
2014	Citra Budaya	Featured in her live albums of traditional concert, Konsert Lentera Timur Dato' Siti Nurhaliza.

Songs/singles from a group compilation or special works

Year	Title	Notes
1996	Mawarku (duet with 2 By 2)	Featured in an album by 2 By 2, Rindu. As of 2005, the album has been sold over 100,000 units.
1996	Lagu Gembira (duet with 2 By 2)	Featured in an album by 2 By 2, Rindu. As of 2005, the album has been sold over 100,000 units.
1997	Gubahanku (duet with 2 By 2)	Featured in an album by 2 By 2, Pak Pung Mustafe. The album has been sold over 100,000 units.
1997	Tiga Malam (duet with 2 By 2)	Featured in an album by 2 By 2, Pak Pung Mustafe. The album has been sold over 100,000 units.
1998	Nikmat Hari Raya (duet with Noraniza Idris and 5 September)	Featured in an Eid ul-Fitr album, Seleksi Hari Raya.
1998	Kini Kau Disisi	Featured in an album with Noraniza Idris and Liza Hanim, Molek.
1998	Kuala Lumpur	A special song promoting Kuala Lumpur.
1998	Tiga Malam (solo version)	Featured in a compilation album with Noraniza Idris, Liza Hanim and A to Z.
1999	Xin Yuan (duet with Candy Cheah)	Siti's first Mandarin song which was featured in Candy Cheah's debut album, Wa Zi. The album has been sold more than 10,000 units
2000	Ask For More	Promotional theme for Pepsi, an alternative cover of Janet Jackson's original, where it also has a Malay version of the same song, Nikmat Terasa.
2000	Nikmat Terasa	Promotional theme for Pepsi, an alternative cover of Janet Jackson's original, where it also has a Malay version of the same song, Nikmat Terasa.
2001	Cuti-Cuti Malaysia	A theme song to promote domestic tourism with the collaboration with Malaysia's Ministry of Tourism.
2001	Nikmat Hari Mulia (duet with Aqasha, New Boys and Noraniza Idris)	Featured in an Eid ul-Fitr album, Salam Aidilfitri.
2001	Pandang-pandang Jeling-jeling (duet with Tan Sri S.M Salim)	Featured in an album by Tan Sri S.M. Salim, Perjalanan Seni - S M Salim & Malaysian Philharmonic Orchestra. As of 2003, the album has been sold more than 60,000 units.
2001	Mohon Kasih (duet with Tan Sri S.M Salim)	Featured in an album by Tan Sri S.M. Salim, Perjalanan Seni - S M Salim & Malaysian Philharmonic Orchestra. As of 2003, the album has been sold more than 60,000 units.
2002	Aidilfitri Di Alaf Baru (duet with Anis Suraya, Liza Hanim, New Boys and Noraniza Idris)	Featured in an Eid ul-Fitr album, Fiesta Aidilfitri.
2002	Membaca Gaya Warisan	A theme song for reading campaign, with collaboration with various artists.
2002	TMNet theme song (Malay Version)	A promotional song during her 2-years contract with TM Net (Internet service), where it also has an English version.
2002	TMNet theme song (English Version)	A promotional song during her 2-years contract with TM Net (Internet service), where it also has an English version.
2003	Treasure The World	A song composed by Kazufumi Miyazawa and Dick Lee for Japan and Asean Pop Stars Dream Concert 2003 (J-Asean Pops 2003) in Yokohama, Japan where it is a song where each singer from each country sang that song in their native language. She also sang the solo Malay version of the song, Dunia Milik Kita.
2003	Dunia Milik Kita	A song composed by Kazufumi Miyazawa and Dick Lee for Japan and Asean Pop Stars Dream Concert 2003 (J-Asean Pops 2003) in Yokohama, Japan where it is a song where each singer from each country sang that song in their native language. She also sang the solo Malay version of the song, Dunia Milik Kita.
2003	Tetap Di Sini	A theme song for movie Paloh.
2003	Bergending Dang Gong (duet with Tan Sri S.M Salim)	Featured in an album by Tan Sri S.M. Salim, Sekarang Dah Jadi.
2003	Cintai Kraf Malaysia	A theme song for campaign to appreciating Malaysian's craft and handy works.
2003	Semarak Kedamaian (duet with Ning Baizura, Erra Fazira, Yusry KRU, Fazley and Ezlynn)	A theme song Malaysian Peace Campaign.
2004	Bagaikan Sakti (duet with M. Nasir)	A theme song for movie Puteri Gunung Ledang.
2004	Aktifkan Dirimu (duet with Reshmonu, Vince Chong and Zahid)	A promotional song during her 2-year contract with Maxis-Hotlink, where it also has an English version, Activate Yourself.
2004	Activate Yourself(duet with Reshmonu, Vince Chong and Zahid)	A promotional song during her 2-year contract with Maxis-Hotlink, where it also has an English version, Activate Yourself.
2004	With All Our Hearts	A theme song for foundation that she has been an ambassador to since 2002.
2005	Dua Dunia (duet with Too Phat)	Featured in an album by Too Phat, Rebirth Into Reality where she also sang with them the English version, Million Miles. The album as of 2007 has been sold to more than 25 000 copies, and the song itself has been downloaded for more than 120 000 times.
2005	Million Miles (duet with Too Phat)	Featured in an album by Too Phat, Rebirth Into Reality where she also sang with them the English version, Million Miles. The album as of 2007 has been sold to more than 25 000 copies, and the song itself has been downloaded for more than 120 000 times.
2005	Untuk Terakhir Kali	Featured in a compilation album, Bintang Hati.
2005	Pohon Asmara	Featured in a compilation album, Bintang Hati.
2005	Seri Sarawak	Previously unreleased track, featured in a compilation album of traditional songs alongside other artiste, Gemersik Irama Melayu.
2005	Aktifkan Ke Dunia Baru	Her second promotional theme song for Maxis.
2005	Bulan Kedamaian	A song for Eid ul-Fitr that wasn't released into any albums.
2006	Budi Bahasa Budaya Kita	A theme song for promoting good deeds and virtues with the collaboration with the Ministry of Culture, Arts and Heritage.
2006	Mahligai Gading	A theme song for a Malay television series, Mahligai Gading.
2007	Menanti Pasti	A theme song for movie Kayangan.
2007	Warna-Warna Malaysiaku Gemilang	A promotional song for promoting unity among Malaysian's youth, where she was also one of the icons for the campaign.
2008	Pada Cintanya	Theme song for a Malay Drama, Spa Q 2.
2008	Ampun Tuanku Duli Baginda	A special song released to commemorate the 50th year on throne of Sultan Abdul Halim Mu'adzam Shah of Kedah.
2009	Suara Sepi	Performed during Palestinian charity concert, Konsert Atas Kemanusian.
2009	Satu Malaysia	1Malaysia song contestant.
2010	Hanya Semalam (duet with M. Nasir)	Performed in Esplanade Theatre, Singapore.
2010	Rahsiaku Milikmu	SimplySiti's theme song which come in a CD for every purchase of SimplySiti's products.
2010	Kini DiKau Jauh	She sang the song along with her member of family which it is dedicated to her late father. The song is included in Siti's sisters' collaboration album, Apresiasi.
2010	Harapan Tanpa Suara (duet with Adibah Noor, Aizat Amdan, Amy Mastura, Anita Sarawak, Anuar Zain, Aznil Nawawi, Erra Fazira, Mawi and Maya Karin)	A special song in co-operation with Malaysia's Ministry of Women, Family and Community Development and Utusan Malaysia newspaper.
2010	Panggilan (duet with Siti Saerah and Siti Norsaida)	Her latest duet with her sisters, Siti Saerah and Siti Norsaida for Aidilfitri.
2011	Satu Malaysia (duet with Atilia, Bob, Danell Lee, Reshmonu, Suki Low and Zainal Abidin)	Also known as 1Malaysia song^{[note 5]}, where she did a recording with - Atilia, Bob, Danell Lee, Reshmonu, Suki Low and Zainal Abidin in conjunction with Malaysia's Government Transformation Programme to commemorate the first year of its achievements.
2011	Astana Jiwa	A theme song for a Malay drama Astana Jiwa, composed by Audi Mok and Omar K.
2012	Muhammad Al Ameen (duet with Rabbani)	A duet song with a Malaysian Nasyid group, Rabbani in remembrance of Prophet Muhammad's 1433rd Mawlid (birthday).
2012	You Came To Me (duet with Sami Yusuf)	Will be featured in Sami Yusuf's latest album, Salaam where the song was recorded in three different languages - Arabic, Malay and English. The album sold Platinum in South-East Asia (15,000 units).
2012	Cinta Tanpa Sempadan (duet with Nurul Zahid)	A charity song to collect funds for Persatuan Kebajikan Anak Pesakit HIV/AIDS Nurul Iman Malaysia (Pernim), an organisation for children infected with HIV and AIDS.
2012	Gerak Serentak	New songs for 15th Malaysia Games or SUKMA XV, she performed these songs at the opening and closing ceremonies on 9 and 16 July 2012.
2012	Popaleh Weh	New songs for 15th Malaysia Games or SUKMA XV, she performed these songs at the opening and closing ceremonies on 9 and 16 July 2012.
2012	Muara Hati (duet with Hafiz Suip)	A theme song for an 80 episodes TV series, Adam & Hawa.
2013	Galau	Her first single that collaborated with Universal Music Malaysia.
2013	Tanah Airku Tanah Airmu Jua (duet with Monoloque)	A duet song in conjunction with the Malaysia's National Day.
2015	Mikraj Cinta	Mikraj Cinta was released on 21 June 2015 as the lead single and then was included in her live album, Unplugged as one of the bonus tracks. It was given to Siti for her performance for "Sirah Rasullulah" (Life of the Messenger of God) in conjunction with Prophet Muhammad's mawlid on 3, 4 and 7 January 2015. In 2019 this single has been received 4× Platinum for sold over 800,000 units.
2015	Nenje Ezhu	Her first recording Tamil song. This song was featured in the International Superstar 2015 program TV, a reality singing competitions on Astro Ulagam. The original song that composed by A.R Rahman for the film, Mariyaan.
2015	Kau Ilhamku (2015)	An exclusive rendition of R&B and pop version of Man Bai's classic song, “Kau Ilhamku” has been reimagined to celebrate the launch of the Yonder Music app in Malaysia. The song was featured top local as well as regional artistes like Yuna, Ariel Noah, Afgan, Elizabeth Tan, Jaclyn Victor, Joe Flizzow, SoneOne, Cita Citata and Russell Curtis. The song was produced by J-Key and Russell Curtis.
2016	Memories	A previously unreleased song by Whitney Houston. Recorded by Whitney in 1982, the unreleased song was given to Siti by Yonder Music and was performed as a "digital duet" for the first time at her Dato' Siti Nurhaliza & Friends Concert.
2016	Hari Kemenangan	A special single for Eid al-Fitr, written by Siso Kopratasa and produced by Pak Ngah Suhaimi.
2016	Dirgahayu (duet with Faizal Tahir)	A theme song for an adaptation Mexico (La Loba) 100 episodes TV series, Lara Aishah. This song then was included in the Faizal Tahir's album call "Anatomi", later on 2 August 2019, this album received 6× Platinum and the song certified 5× Platinum for sold more than 1,000,000 units.
2018	Oh Nana	She had been special appearance and transform to 3D animation known as Mak Iti and sing a song Oh Nana in Konsert Hora Horey Didi & Friends movie.
2018	Comel Pipi Merah	A specially song created for her daughter who was expected to be born in March 2018 and inspired by her father's, Taruddin Ismail who had been heard by her as a child. The single went 4× Platinum for sold over 800,000 units.
2018	Cinta Syurga (duet with Khai Bahar)	This single is an inspiration from 2 student from Johor's Maahad that sing Comel Pipi Merah in Islamic Zikr version. The single was certified Gold for sold over 150,000 units.
2018	Anta Permana	Anta Permana mean Infinity and it from Malay classical word. This song composed by Hael Husaini dan Ezra Kong. The single has been received 11× Platinum for sold over 2,200,000 units.
2018	#JomCintaNabi	A special video clip for #JomCintaNabi campaign in conjunction with Maulidur Rasul that combines many artists like Hafiz Hamidun, Datuk Seri Siti Nurhaliza, Khai Bahar, UNIC, Usop (mentor), Masya Masyitah and Nur Al Badar group.
2019	Ikhlas	A special single for Eid al-Fitr, written by Omar K dan Ikhwan Fatanna. In this single she was collaborated with Nissa Sabyan (Indonesia) and Taufik Batisah (Singapore). The song and music video were exclusively released at Apple Music on 31 May 2019.
2019	Lambaian Aidilfitri	A special rerecord song and video clip for Eid al-Fitr and was released on Astro Channels. In this song she was duet with Syafiq Farhain.
2019	Kasihku Selamanya	The song composed by Aubrey Suwito and written by AD Samad was an original sound track (OST) for film Revenge of the Pontianak (Dendam Pontianak) produced Tiger Tiger Pictures and distributed by Golden Village Pictures in Singapore.
2019	Terang	A special single for SimplySiti Di Hati 2019 campaign, collaboration with her SimplySiti product and Yayasan Institut Jantung Negara, this campaign is to help children with heart disease. This song were composed by Aubrey Suwito and lyric by Shah Shamsiri. The song and music video were available at all digital platform on 1 November 2019.
2020	7 Nasihat	The single written by Kmy Kmo and Luca Sickta. According to Siti this song very special because has a combination between hip hop, rap and traditional.
2020	SAMA SAMA Sehati	Special song collaboration between CUCKOO International (MAL) Sdn Bhd (CUCKOO) to lends moral support to all frontline workers working fight against the COVID-19.
2020	Gemilang (Special COVID-19)	This special video that gather Malaysian artists was produced by Nourul Depp, who also a singer to give a courage and hope to Malaysian. Singers that also participating in the mission included Ella, Yuna, Ning Baizura, Daphne Iking, Dynas Mokhtar, Floor 88, Adibah Noor, Zahida Rafik dan Rozi Abdul Razak.

== Videography ==
=== Solo video albums ===
Title	Album details
Siti Nurhaliza	Released: 1997; Formats: VCD, VHS, Label: Suria Records
Cindai	Released: 1997; Formats: VCD, VHS, Label: Suria Records
Adiwarna	Released: 1998; Formats: VCD, VHS, Label: Suria Records
Safa	Released: 2001; Formats: VCD; Label: Suria Records

=== Solo compilation video albums ===
Year	Title
CT Best 1	Released: 1998; Formats: VCD; Label: Suria Records
CT Best 2	Released: 1999; Formats: VCD; Label: Suria Records
The Best of Siti Nurhaliza	Released: 2000; Formats: VCD; Label: Suria Records
CT Best 3	Released: 2001; Formats: VCD; Label: Suria Records
CT Best 4	Released: 2001; Formats: VCD; Label: Suria Records
CT Best 5	Released: 2003; Formats: VCD; Label: Suria Records
CT Best 6	Released: 2003; Formats: VCD; Label: Suria Records
CT Best 7	Released: 2003; Formats: VCD; Label: Suria Records
CT Best 8	Released: 2004; Formats: VCD; Label: Suria Records
Puing-puing Cinta Vol. 1	Released: 2009; Formats: VCD; Label: Suria Records
Puing-puing Cinta Vol. 2	Released: 2009; Formats: VCD; Label: Suria Records

=== Special video albums ===
Year	Title
Juara Lagu Bersama Siti Nurhaliza	Released: 2002; Formats: VCD; Label: Suria Records
Juara Lagu Bersama Siti Nurhaliza Vol. 2	Released: 2005; Formats: VCD; Label: Suria Records

=== DVD albums ===
Year	Title
Siti Nurhaliza In Concert, Royal Albert Hall London	Released: 2006; Formats: DVD; Label: Suria Records
The Best of Siti Nurhaliza	Released: 2006; Formats: DVD; Label: Suria Records
2 Diva	Released: 2008; Formats: VCD, DVD, Label: Suria Records, Warner Music Malaysia
Anugerah Aidilfitri	Released: 2009; Formats: DVD, Label: Suria Records

=== Duet video albums ===
Year	Title
Seri Balas	Released: 2007; Formats: VCD; Label: Suria Records
Mawar-mawarku	Released: 2007; Formats: VCD; Label: Suria Records
2 Diva	Released: 2008; Formats: VCD, DVD, Label: Suria Records, Warner Music Malaysia

== Footnotes ==
- Note 1: Recording Industry Association of Malaysia (RIM) divided the charts based on whether the albums are locally or internationally produced. It also has separate chart for compilation albums.
- Note 2: This album could be charted higher than stated here, since the data by the Billboard starting to be available early 1997 whereas the album was released in April 1996.
- Note 4: The sale for the first four months.
- Note 5: Not to be confused with the song she entered for the 2009 1Malaysia song competition which also bears the same.

== See also ==
- List of songs recorded by Siti Nurhaliza
