= List of Siti Nurhaliza live performances =

Siti Nurhaliza live performances
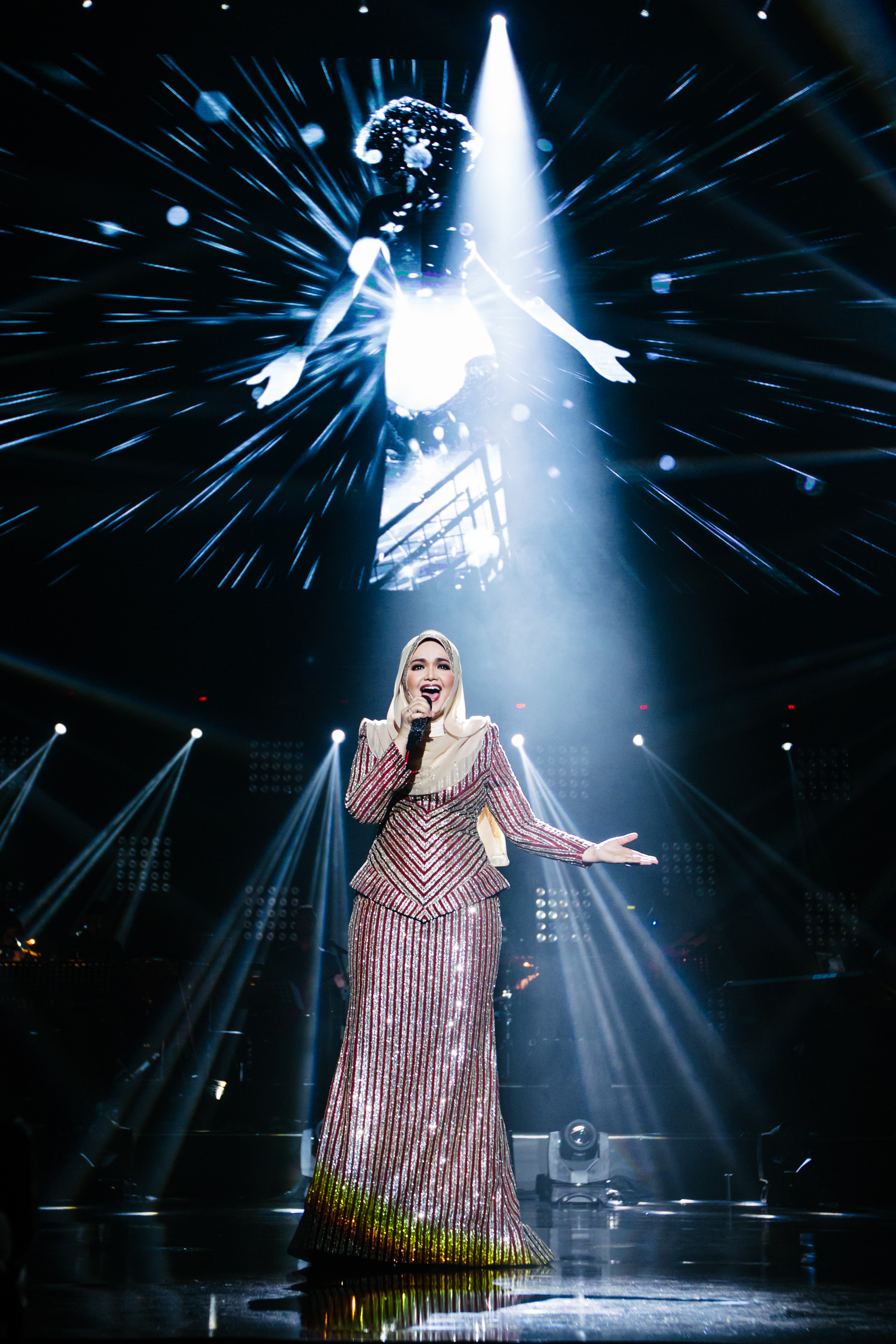
- Siti Nurhaliza performing in 2016
- Concert tours: 3
- Concert residencies: 4

Malaysian singer, Siti Nurhaliza has headlined concerts and performed live at award ceremonies and on television specials. Her first live television performance came when she competed in the reality television talent show Bintang HMI (1985), which she won with a performance of "Camar Yang Pulang" by Aishah. She released her first single, "Jerat Percintaan", followed by her self-titled debut album, in 1996. Her first solo concert, Konsert Live Siti Nurhaliza, was held on 30 October 1999 at the Putra Stadium, Bukit Jalil, which received positive reception. She then staged her second solo concert also held in Putra Stadium, Konsert Mega Siti Nurhaliza on 30 June 2001. Her performance and showmanship was well-received and garnered praise from music critics and concert reviewers. In May and June 2002, she staged a tribute concert entitled Konsert Salam Terakhir Siti Nurhaliza Untukmu Sudir at the Istana Budaya to mark 10th anniversary of singer Sudirman Arshad's death.

She also staged her concerts in Singapore, Indonesia, and England. In 2005, she staged her first international solo concert Siti Nurhaliza in Concert which took place on 1 April 2005 at the Royal Albert Hall, London. Her first concert residency, SATU, took place at Istana Budaya from 26 to 28 June 2009 to support her 13th studio album Lentera Timur and it is her first theatrical concert.

== Headlining concerts ==
List of headlining concerts, with dates, associated albums, venues and number of performances
Title	Date	Associated album(s)	Venue	City	Shows	Ref.
Konsert Live Siti Nurhaliza	October 30, 1999	—N/a	Putra Stadium	Kuala Lumpur	1	
Konsert Mega Siti Nurhaliza	June 30, 2001	—N/a	Putra Stadium	Kuala Lumpur	1	

== Concert residencies ==
List of concerts residencies, with dates, venues and number of performances
Title	Date	Venue	City	Shows	Ref.
SATU Konsert Eksklusif Siti Nurhaliza	June 26, 2009 –June 28, 2009	Istana Budaya	Kuala Lumpur	3	
Siti Nurhaliza in Symphony	July 5, 2013 –July 7, 2013	Petronas Philharmonic Hall	Kuala Lumpur	3	
Konsert Lentera Timur	September 20, 2013 –September 24, 2013	Istana Budaya	Kuala Lumpur	3	

== Benefit concerts ==
List of benefit concerts, with dates, venues and number of performances
Title	Date	Venue	City	Shows	Ref.
Dato' Siti Nurhaliza Live In KLCC: Where The Heart Is	February 7, 2014 –February 8, 2014	Kuala Lumpur Convention Centre	Kuala Lumpur	2	
