= Konsert Lentera Timur =

Konsert Lentera Timur Dato’ Siti Nurhaliza
- Concert by Siti Nurhaliza
- Location: Kuala Lumpur, Malaysia
- Venue: Istana Budaya
- Associated album: Cindai, Sahmura, Sanggar Mustika, Lentera Timur, Klasik and Seri Balas
- Start date: 20 September 2013
- End date: 24 September 2013
- No. of shows: 4

Siti Nurhaliza concert chronology
- Siti Nurhaliza in Symphony (2013); Konsert Lentera Timur (2013); Dato’ Siti Nurhaliza Live In KLCC: Where The Heart Is (2014)

Konsert Lentera Timur (Malaysian for the Eastern Beacon Concert; also known as Konsert Lentera Timur Dato’ Siti Nurhaliza) was a concert by Malaysian recording artist, Siti Nurhaliza. Held on four non consecutive nights in September 2013 at Istana Budaya, this was her first concert in which the songs performed were mainly driven by traditional Malay and folk music genres. Many of the songs were taken or derived from her four solo traditional albums: Cindai (1997), Sahmura (2000), Sanggar Mustika (2002) and Lentera Timur (2008). During the course of the four-night concert, she performed more than 30 songs and was backed by 40-piece traditional Malaysian orchestra, Orkestra Traditional Malaysia (OTM). The musical backing included an amalgamation of sounds from different traditional musical instruments, including strings and percussion that are synonymous with Malaysia's multiracial culture – Rebana, Er-hu, Sitar and Sapeh.

Though tentatively scheduled as a three-night concert, from 20 to 22 September, a fourth date was added to fulfill the demands from Siti's fans, fans of traditional music, and guests of Malaysia's Ministry of Tourism and Culture – the concert's official sponsor and patron. Although she was plagued with a sore throat and cough in the days before the concert, Siti's performance received positive reviews and critical acclaim for her ability to maintain vocal control while simultaneously energetically performing traditional dances.

On 27 October, the concert was revealed to be the most successful solo concert ever held at Istana Budaya, where it managed to collect more than RM 900 000 surpassing record previously made by Jamal Abdillah.

== Background and development ==
"I am performing songs that are most memorable to me; even though there are other Malay folk songs and traditional songs that are synonymous to my name, like "Seri Mersing", these 35 songs are my gift to the fans."

— Siti Nurhaliza in Konsert Lentera Timur, (First night of the performance) (Note: Original:"Siti menyampaikan lagu yang lebih ada kenangan dalam hidup Siti, biarpun banyak lagi rangkaian lagu Melayu asli dan tradisional yang serasi dengan nama saya seperti Seri Mersing tapi inilah 35 buah lagu hadiah Siti kepada peminat.")

Born and raised in a traditional music inclined-family (her grandfather Bachik Abdul Rahman was a famous local violinist and her mother, Siti Salmah Bachik was a traditional music singer), Malaysian singer Siti Nurhaliza began planning for a full traditional-themed concert beginning in 2010. The chance for such a performance came when Istana Budaya decided to collaborate with Orkestra Tradisional Malaysia (OTM) to have a full concert in which the set list was composed of traditional Malay songs and folksongs. The name of the concert was actually taken from one of her traditional albums, Lentera Timur (Eastern Beacon).

Preparation for the concert began as early as August 2013, when Nurhaliza was reported to be practising her vocals and dance movements. The month-long training included learning the dance steps for Mak Yong and also lines in her native Pahang dialect for Dikir Barat. The preparation for the concert also included training for Siti to maintain her stamina throughout the lengthy performances, each expected to last two hours and thirty minutes; many of the songs that were performed in the concert not only require her to dance but also maintain her voice and breath control while singing.

Originally intended to be a 3-day concert, a fourth date (24 September) was added after Siti received high demands from her fans and fans of traditional music; guests of Malaysia's Ministry of Tourism and Culture, the event's official sponsor and patron, were also considered. For the four-day concert, Siti performed more than 30 songs originating from traditional Malay and folk music, including Asli, Ghazal, Joget, Keroncong, Masri, Samrah and few others. All songs that were performed were arranged by Aubrey Suwito and Mohd Yazid Zakaria and were divided into several medleys and single performances interspersed between several sketches and special acts. Though many of the songs on the setlist were taken from her previous solo traditional albums – Cindai (1997), Sahmura (2000), Sanggar Mustika (2002) and Lentera Timur (2008) as well as her duet traditional album, Seri Balas (1999) – there were also songs that had been made famous by P. Ramlee as well as classical Malay folksongs. One of the main goals of the concert was to promote and elevate the status of Malaysian cultural arts, particularly Malay songs, in the eyes of the younger generation and outsiders who are not familiar with the Malay culture.

Several days before the concert, Siti was reported to have contracted a cough and sore throat, which continued to plague her until the day of the concert.

== Performances ==
=== Fashion and stage ===
Throughout all four nights of the concert, Siti wore at least three different traditional Malay dresses that were designed by four local designers – Cosry, Hatta Dolmat, Rizman Ruzaini and Zery Zamri. Her choice of dresses for the concert was praised by critics and reviewers. Both Kemalia Othman of mStar and Azhariah Kamin of The Star said Siti looked "stunning" and "resplendent as ever" during the course of the performance. For the opening sequence, she also wore a complete dress traditionally worn by Mak Yong performers, before donning one of the designed traditional dresses for her next song. While on stage, she was backed up by 40-piece Malaysian Traditional Orchestra conducted by Mohd Yazid Zakaria, and dancers and performers from Artistana Istana Budaya and Badan Seni Budaya Polis Diraja Malaysia (PDRM). The orchestra consisted of various musical instruments that are commonly used by the different ethnic groups in Malaysia, including Rebab, flute, Sapeh, percussion, Gaohu, Zhonghu, Er-hu, Dizi and Sitar. Apart from the orchestra and the backup performers, in one the performances, she was also backed by a group of Dikir Barat performers from Kumpulan Dikir Akademi Arjunasukma, led by a tukang karut (creative leader of a Dikir Barat group), Isey Fazlisham.

During a press conference promoting this concert, Siti hinted that in some of the performances she would be accompanied by two other guest artists. One of these was Suhaimi Mohd Zain, commonly known as Pak Ngah, and the other's identity was only revealed on the day of the performance: this surprise guest, Datuk M. Daud Kilau, performed two songs, "Cek Mek Molek" and "Laksamana Raja di Laut", with Siti.

=== Concert synopsis ===
The first show began with Siti performing the traditional Malay dance Mak Yong with Siti Norhabsah Sheikh Ahmad, first while singing the song "Sedayung Makyung", then while singing "Ala Donde". However, on later dates ( 21, 22 and 24 September), she was accompanied by Rosnan Rahman, a Mak Yong activist who is also her tutor in the dance. Once she had performed the two opening songs, she went backstage. A hydraulic stage was then raised from the audience's left moving upward, revealing Siti's supporting musicians and the conductor of the concert, OTM's Mohd Yazid Zakaria. For the third song, "Nirmala", she exited a beacon-shaped cage which is located atop the stage then descended a flight of stairs while singing the tune "Kurik Kundi", accompanied by 22 dancers from Badan Seni Budaya PDRM. Between the fourth song and the next, she blew a blowpipe to hit one a balloon target. On the first night joked, "Can you guys guess how long it took me to practise this? Too long, I can tell you!”.

Before starting with the second medley, Siti detailed her family's interest in traditional Malay music. She also shared her memories of her late father, who often compared her to the Tan Sri P. Ramlee's song "Bunga Melor" (literally "Jasmine"), before paying tribute to her father by singing the song. It was followed by another classical piece, "Mahligai Permata". In the third medley, she performed a string of songs ("Patah Hati", "Janji" and "Kau Pergi Tanpa Pesan"), which she jokingly referred to as "Medley Orang Merajuk" (A Medley for the Morose), saying that she used to sing if upset at her husband. She ends the medley by jokingly advising members of the audience, "To those who are sulking, sing this song. [Because] when I sing this song, Datuk K (her husband) is brought to his knees". (Note: Original:"Sesiapa yang merajuk, nyanyilah lagu ni. Siti bila menyanyi lagu ini Datuk K terus cair.") In the next performance, she takes on the persona of a female tukang karut for "Dikir Timur" (Eastern Dikir), a song in her native Pahang dialect; this was opposed to the song traditionally known as "Dikir Barat" (Western Dikir), in the Kelantanese dialect, with the role of tukang karut taken by Isey Fazlisham from Kumpulan Dikir Akademi Arjunasukma. During the performances the two of them bantered and joked in their preferred dialects. Later, Siti performed another three medleys consecutively, each with three songs, and each medley with its own storyline. This was followed by a break for Siti to change her costume. During the break, her supporting musicians took the center stage and performed "Beat It" by Michael Jackson, adding a traditional Malay flavour.

For the first performance after the first break, Siti brought in her surprise guest artist, Dato' M. Daud Kilau. After performing "Cek Mek Molek" as a solo, he was revealed to be one of Siti's duet partners when the two began singing "Laksamana Raja di Laut". Later, Siti performed the song "Ketawalah Lagi" on her own, following it with a medley of two songs - "Ada Masa Mata" and "Bintang Malam". In recognition of Malaysia Day, which had occurred a few days earlier, she also sang the only patriotic song in her setlist: "Bahtera Merdeka". Following the performance, she premiered a song from her pop album Transkripsi, "Biarlah Rahsia", which was given a more traditional arrangement. Before performing this song, she showed her skill at playing bonang, a musical instrument. In addition to Dato' M. Daud Kilau, Siti also performed with a man who had collaborated with her on a number of her traditional songs and albums, Datuk Suhaimi Mohd Zain (more commonly known as Pak Ngah). With him, she sang a further two songs, "Rampaianku" and "Damak", the latter of which was originally composed by Pak Ngah. She later performed another three songs, also composed by Pak Ngah: "Balqis", "Ya Maulai" and "Cindai". The first two were strung together as her final medley of the night. As a finale, she performed "Popaleh Weh" while simultaneously playing gendang.

== Critical response ==
Syazwan Zakariah of Astro Awani began his review by stating, "To be honest, I've run out of praise for Datuk Siti Nurhaliza. Nevertheless, I agree with people who say that [you can] listen to her singing thousands of times, but still be in awe [of the performances] and never bored. I don't know how "buluh perindu" (very sweet voice) sounds, but if I can find my very own definition for it, "buluh perindu" is her voice." (Note: Original:"Sebenarnya saya sudah habis kata-kata pujian untuk Datuk Siti Nurhaliza. Namun, saya sangat setuju bila ada orang kata, dengarlah dia menyanyi beribu kali pun, kita akan tetap terpesona dan tidak pernah jemu. Saya tidak tahu bagaimana bunyinya buluh perindu, tetapi jika saya boleh mencari definisinya sendiri, buluh perindu itulah suara Siti.") He wrote that, through this concert, Siti has proven herself as a "true entertainer" and not only as an artist who sings songs. He concluded his review by stating that Siti is the true "lentera" ("beacon") who brings light to the Malaysia's music industry. One of the reviewers from Kosmo! likewise described Siti as the "ideal reference" for the definition of buluh perindu.

Azhariah Kamin of The Star described the show as a "spectacle" and found that Siti looked "resplendent as ever", though she was worried how a full traditional concert will sound. This point was also raised by like Muhammad Azrul Mohd. Radi of Utusan Online, who indicated that a 2-hour concert of traditional songs could be demanding as it requires the utmost quality of melisma and vocal control to maintain the audience's interest. Azhariah commented the situation as:

Granted, that I was a bit worried prior to the concert. Let’s face it: A two-hour concert of traditional songs was a daunting proposition. But for a solid two-hour show, the audience who packed Panggung Sari in Istana Budaya in Kuala Lumpur were literally spellbound with the performances by Siti who was backed the Malaysian Traditional Orchestra (OTM). This writer was mesmerised too.

During the concert, Siti was still plagued by sore throat that had affected her a few day before the concert and she was still recovering from it up on day of the concert, though this was only noticeable when she talked and interacted with the audience. Though she was stricken with sore throat, her vocal performance during the concert was received positively by critics and reviewers. Norhadiani Baharon of Harian Metro expressed her admiration of Siti being able to show her fighting spirit and bring closer the audience to the Malay music and culture, despite the singer's sore throat, Syazwan Zakariah of Astro Awani commented: "No matter how hard the melismas, no matter how high the pitch, the [musical] strains still went 'smoothly', and all was done while [she's] smiling as if she bore no burdens". (Note: Original:"Sesusah mana pun lenggoknya, setinggi mana pun nadanya, alunannya tetap 'licin', sambil wajah mengukir senyum seperti tiada bebanan di bahu.") Kamarudin Razal of Gua.com.my also praised Siti for being able to maintain her energy throughout the night. Earlier, he also praised the "completeness" of the concert, with its colourful and beautiful co-ordination of the music and the dances, in addition to Siti's "angelic" voice. He also commented that this concert was the best of the year and has also managed to up the ante in Malaysia's music industry. Fatin Farhana Arriffin of Berita Harian described the concert as a "manifestation of Siti's love towards the traditional music as well as proof of her versatility", (Note: Original:"...manifestasi kecintaan Siti terhadap irama tradisional, selain membuktikan dia penyanyi serba boleh.") while Wahidah Othman of Mangaonline.com.my called the concert as "great" and "awe-inspiring". Despite a minor technical glitch during midway of the first night of the concert, most reviewers agreed that, overall, the concert was a success.

== Commercial performance ==
Tickets for the concert were made available since August 2013, prior to the concert's first press conference through its official vendor, AirAsiaRedtix.com. The tickets were also made available for manual pick-up from various official outlets. Listed from RM 78 to RM 518, the tickets that went on sale were already selling out during the first press conference where even the cheapest tickets have sold out too, resulting to an additional date (24 September) added to the original three-night dates. On 27 October, the 4-night concert was revealed as to be the most successful solo concert ever held at Istana Budaya, where it managed to collect more than RM 900 000, surpassing record previously made by Jamal Abdillah.

== Set list ==
1. Sedayung Makyung & Ala Donde Medley (Musical Arrangement by OTM)
  1. "Sedayung Makyung"
  2. "Ala Donde"
2. "Nirmala" (Musical Arrangement by Ruslan Imam)
3. "Kurik Kundi" (Musical Arrangement by Isabella Pek)
4. Bunga Melor & Mahligai Permata Medley (Musical Arrangement by Luqman Aziz)
  1. "Bunga Melor"
  2. "Mahligai Permata"
5. Patah Hati, Janji & Kau Pergi Tanpa Pesan Medley (Musical Arrangement by Isabella Pek)
  1. "Patah Hati"
  2. "Janji"
  3. "Kau Pergi Tanpa Pesan"
6. "Dikir Barat" (Musical Arrangement by OTM)
7. Masri Manis, Kaparinyo & Sulam Sembilan Medley (Musical Arrangement by OTM)
  1. "Masri Manis"
  2. "Kaparinyo"
  3. "Sulam Sembilan"
8. Jangan di Tanya, Joget Kasih Tak Sudah & Joget Pahang Medley (Musical Arrangement by OTM)
  1. "Jangan di Tanya"
  2. "Joget Kasih Tak Sudah"
  3. "Joget Pahang"
9. Bulan Yang Mesra, Empat Dara & Hati Kama Medley (Musical Arrangement by OTM)
  1. "Bulan Yang Mesra"
  2. "Empat Dara"
  3. "Hati Kama"
10. "Beat It" (Musical Arrangement by OTM)
11. "Cek Mek Molek" (Musical Arrangement by Shamsul Zin)
12. "Laksamana Raja di Laut" (Musical Arrangement by Datuk Suhaimi Mohd Zain)
13. "Ketawalah Lagi" (Musical Arrangement by Leonard Yeap Lin Soon)
14. Ada Masa Mata & Bintang Malam Medley (Musical Arrangement by Mohd Fikri Abdul Rahim)
  1. "Ada Masa Mata"
  2. "Bintang Malam"
15. "Bahtera Merdeka" (Musical Arrangement by Lillian Loo Shu Chin)
16. "Biarlah Rahsia" (Musical Arrangement by Lillian Loo Shu Chin)
17. "Rampaianku" (Musical Arrangement by Datuk Suhaimi Mohd Zain)
18. "Damak" (Musical Arrangement by Shamsul Zin)
19. Balqis & Ya Maulai Medley (Musical Arrangement by Lillian Loo Shu Chin)
  1. "Balqis"
  2. "Ya Maulai"
20. "Cindai" (Musical Arrangement by Ruslan Imam)
21. "Popaleh Weh" (Musical Arrangement by Ruslan Imam)

Source: Adapted from concert's tour program's liner notes.

Additional notes

- The song "Beat It" was not sung, rather it was covered using traditional musical instruments during a performance break.
- In some of the nights of the concert, medley of "Ada Masa Mata" and "Bintang Malam" was not performed.

== Personnel ==
Credits adapted from concert's tour program's liner notes.

- Dr. Junaida Lee Abdullah - advisor
- Siti Norhabsah Sheikh Ahmad - guest artist
- Wan Azman Wan Ahmad - stage manager
- Mohd Shahril Akla - choreographer
- Baby Akmal - backup vocalist
- Nan Alias - guest musician (guitar)
- Muslih Aling - guest artist
- Kumpulan Dikir Akademi Arjunasukma - guest artist
- Dato' Seri Mohamed Nazri bin Tan Sri Abdul Aziz - patron
- Cosry - costume designer
- Firdaus Dalip - monitor engineer
- Hatta Dolmat - costume designer
- Isey Fazlisham - guest artist
- Lokman Ghani - performance director, idea, concept, script, coordinator
- Badan Seni Budaya PDRM (PDRM Cultural Arts Group) - guest artist
- Alud @ Khairul Azmi Abd. Hamid - manager, concert administrator
- Rashidi bin Hasbullah - advisor
- Ahmad Marzuki Abu Hassan - exhibition designer
- Halizor Hussein @ Fly - guest musician (bass)
- Nazreen Idris - costume designer
- Mohd. Azali Hj. Idris - photographer
- Nur Iman @ Aiman - Siti Nurhaliza Productions workforce (technical)
- Rozita Ismail - manager, concert administrator
- Razali Itam - set/prop designer
- Izzad - backup vocalist
- Dato' M. Daud Kilau - guest artist
- Alvin Koh - sound engineer, recording engineer
- Jamaludin Md Nor - technical director
- Raduan Norudin - photographer
- Mohamad Ozlan Othman - designer, lighting director
- Mohd Azli Othman - manager, concert administrator
- Datuk Dr. Ong Hong Peck - advisor
- Rosnan Rahman (Pak Yong) - guest artist
- Rozi Abdul Razak - idea, concept, script, coordinator
- Zamri Abdul Razak - Siti Nurhaliza Productions workforce (logistic)
- Rizman Ruzaini - costume designer
- Norfadilah Abdul Seman - Siti Nurhaliza Productions workforce (administration)
- Mohammed Juhari Shaarani - executive producer
- Irwan Ismadi Shahrim - art director
- Aubrey Suwito - conductor, music director, guest musician (piano)
- Datuk Hj. Ab. Ghaffar bin A. Tambi - advisor
- Saiful Bahri Tarudin- manager
- Siti Norsaida Tarudin - Siti Nurhaliza Productions workforce (management)
- Siti Nurhaliza Tarudin - executive producer
- Najiffaizal Mohd Tawel - stage visual designer
- Frederick Ngieng Hock Teck - graphic designer
- John Thomas - guest musician (drum)
- Ujang - guest musician (drum)
- Widy - backup vocalist
- Zery Zamri - costume designer
- Datuk Suhaimi Mohd Zain - guest artist
- Juliana Dato Zainal - Siti Nurhaliza Productions workforce (administration)
- Mohd Yazid Zakaria - conductor, music director
