= Siti Nurhaliza I =

Siti Nurhaliza

Studio album by Siti Nurhaliza
- Released: 1 April 1996
- Recorded: 1995–1996
- Studios: Pro Recording Studio, Cheras Perdana
- Genres: Pop, rock
- Length: 47:01
- Label: Suria Records
- Producers: Adnan Abu Hassan, Fauzi Marzuki, Peter Fam

Siti Nurhaliza chronology
Siti Nurhaliza (1996)	Siti Nurhaliza II (1997)

Singles from Siti Nurhaliza
- 1. "Jawapan Di Persimpangan" Released: 1996; 2. "Jerat Percintaan" Released: 1996; 3. "Cari-Cari" Released: 1996

Siti Nurhaliza is the debut studio album by Malaysian singer Siti Nurhaliza, released on 1 April 1996 by Suria Records. The album is the debut of her after winning in a singing competition by RTM, Bintang HMI in 1995.

The album is self-titled, and composed almost entirely of pop and ballad genre with its famous debut single "Jerat Percintaan" which later won the 11th Anugerah Juara Lagu in the same year and sold more than 50,000 copies. She won the title during her first entrance to Anugerah Juara Lagu by beating favourites at that time, Ziana Zain and Fauziah Latiff. Siti Nurhaliza is one of Siti's first of six albums with collaboration with Adnan Abu Hassan, who contributes seven songs in the album.

== Production ==
After winning Bintang HMI in 1995 and the successful release of her duet single with 2 by 2, "Mawarku" ("My Rose"), Siti Nurhaliza was approached by renowned music producer Adnan Abu Hassan and offered her a recording contract with Suria Records in which Adnan who was the label's General Manager at that time. Soon after, the label's manager Tan Su Loke came to her hometown in Temerloh to ask Siti's father, Tarudin Ismail to sign a contract. Prior to joining Suria Records, Siti receive a recording deal with major recording companies – Sony Music, BMG Music and Warner Music. Working with Adnan, who taught her a vocal class, she records her debut album. "Jawapan di Persimpangan" ("An Answer at the Crossroads") is the first song to be recorded in this album.

During the recording of her album, which took place between mid 1995 and early 1996, Siti had to divide her time between Kuala Lipis and Kuala Lumpur every week on Friday by riding bus accompanied by her mother, Siti Salmah Bachik and her brother, Saiful Bahri and return to her hometown in Kuala Lipis on Sunday afternoon as she is still schooling and sitting Sijil Pelajaran Malaysia (SPM) exams.

== Release and reception ==
Siti Nurhaliza was released on 1 April 1996 by Suria Records, with Adnan Abu Hassan as the album producer and two music videos was released from the album – "Jerat Percintaan" and "Jawapan di Persimpangan". The album was well-received and sold more than 50,000 copies, leading Siti Nurhaliza herself won the Best New Female Artist at the 1997 Anugerah Industri Muzik and two nominations for the Best Pop Album and Best Vocal Performance in an Album (Female) at the same award in 1998.

Three singles was released from this album, "Jerat Percintaan" ("Love Trap"), "Jawapan Di Persimpangan" ("An Answer at the Crossroads") and "Cari-Cari" ("Looking"). The album itself as of 2005, has been sold to a total of more than 800,000 units in Malaysia alone.

Siti Nurhaliza would go on to record five more albums with Adnan: Siti Nurhaliza II (1997), Adiwarna (1998), Pancawarna (1999), Safa (2001) and Lentera Timur (2008).

== Track listing ==
No.	Title	Writer(s)	Producer(s)	Length
1.	"Jawapan di Persimpangan" ("An Answer at the Crossroads")	Othman Zainuddin, Hazida	Adnan Abu Hassan	4:21
2.	"Mahligai Asmara" ("Palace of Romance")	Hani M.J	Adnan Abu Hassan	4:10
3.	"Jerat Percintaan" ("Love Trap")	Othman Zainuddin, Hani M.J, Hazida	Adnan Abu Hassan	4:55
4.	"Antara Waktu dan Usia" ("Between Time and Age")	Hani M.J	Adnan Abu Hassan	5:18
5.	"Sempadan" ("The Borders")	Hani M.J	Adnan Abu Hassan	4:48
6.	"Sanggar Bayu" ("The House of Breeze")	Othman Zainuddin	Adnan Abu Hassan	4:37
7.	"Cari-cari" ("Looking")	Shahnaz	Fauzi Marzuki	4:22
8.	"Bicara Luka" ("Hurtful Words")	Amran Omar	Fauzi Marzuki	5:01
9.	"Kerana Jelingan Mu" ("Because of Your Glances")	Lukman S	Adnan Abu Hassan	3:51
10.	"Jalanan Berduri" ("Thorny Paths")	Hani M.J	Peter Fam	5:38
Total length:				47:01

== Personnel ==
Credits adapted from Siti Nurhaliza I booklet liner notes.

- Aidiet – guitar
- Ariffin – promotion unit
- Bard – promotional manager
- Peter Fam – producer
- Jason Foo – production coordinator
- Adnan Abu Hassan – producer, vocals
- Nina Abu Hassan – vocals
- Heintje – make-up
- A.D. Ho – photography
- Sham Amir Hussain – A&R manager
- Idah – vocals
- Genesis Mastering Lab – mixing
- Lau – engineer
- Tan Su Loke – executive producer
- Zulkefli Majid – A&R coordinator
- Fauzi Marzuki – producer
- Hani M.J – songwriter
- Amran Omar – songwriter
- AS Design & Print – creation
- Rahayu – promotion unit
- Riz – promotion unit
- Lukman S – songwriter
- Sabariah – promotion unit (Singapore)
- Shahnaz – songwriter
- Vincent – engineer
- Wong – engineer
- Othman Zainuddin – songwriter

== Accolades ==
- Song Champion, 11th Anugerah Juara Lagu 1996 (Jerat Percintaan)
- Best Performance, 11th Anugerah Juara Lagu 1996 (Jerat Percintaan)
- Best Ballad, 11th Anugerah Juara Lagu 1996 (Jerat Percintaan)
- Best Song, 4th Anugerah Industri Muzik 1997 (Jerat Percintaan)
