= Siti Nurhaliza II =

Studio album by Siti Nurhaliza
- Released: 27 January 1997
- Recorded: 1996–1997
- Genres: Dance-pop, R&B, pop rock, rock, traditional
- Length: 53:58
- Label: Suria Records
- Producers: Adnan Abu Hassan, LY, Zul Mahat, Fauzi Marzuki, Xiao Wong, Helen Yap, David Foster

Siti Nurhaliza chronology
Siti Nurhaliza (1996)	Siti Nurhaliza II (1997)	Cindai (1997)

Singles from Siti Nurhaliza II
- 1. "Aku Cinta Padamu" Released: 1997; 2. "Wajah Kekasih" Released: 1997; 3. "Bisikan Asmara" Released: 1997

Siti Nurhaliza (Note: This is her second album with no title same as her first album. Mostly known as Aku Cinta Padamu or Siti Nurhaliza II.) is the second studio album by Malaysian singer Siti Nurhaliza, released on 27 January 1997 by Suria Records.

Recorded after the release of her debut self-titled album (1996), Siti Nurhaliza II was her two of six collaborations with Adnan Abu Hassan and also one of her two albums released in 1997, the other being Cindai, her first traditional album. For the first time of Siti's career, she wrote the lyrics for the song, "Demi Kasih Kita".

== Production ==
Siti Nurhaliza II was produced by Suria Records for Siti Nurhaliza in 1997, a year after she release her debut album and marks her second collaboration with Adnan Abu Hassan.

Her first single, "Aku Cinta Padamu" became her breakthrough hits in Indonesia and retitled as "Betapa Ku Cinta Padamu" for the Indonesian version. The song also covered in English version as "I Wonder" by an Australian boy band North, in their second album, Straight Up. Siti Nurhaliza re-recorded an English song "The Colour of My Love" originally performed by Celine Dion who considered by Siti as her idol, from her 1993 album of the same title. This marks the first time Siti performing a song in English. For the song "Rindu Di Antara Kita", it features vocals by Siti Nurhaliza and Ciang Teng, where Siti sung in Malay while Ciang Teng sung in Mandarin. Siti also recorded "Sri Mersing", her first traditional song in the album.

Adnan Abu Hassan, the album's producer contributes three songs in the album — "Demi Kasih Kita", "Wajah Kekasih" and "Rindu Di Antara Kita". Other musicians contributes their songs in the album are husband and wife LY and Baiduri ("Aku Cinta Padamu" and "Kesilapanku, Keegoanmu"), Fauzi Marzuki, Zul Mahat, Xiao Wong, Helen Yap, Arthur Ganov and David Foster.

== Release and reception ==
Siti Nurhaliza II was released on 27 January 1997 (17 days after Siti Nurhaliza celebrates her 18th birthday) and was well-received, sold over 400, 000 copies and being certified 6× platinum. Ten music videos were produced for Siti Nurhaliza II. The first single from the album, "Aku Cinta Padamu", where its music video was filmed at the foreground of Kuala Lumpur Tower. For the "Bisikan Asmara" music video, Siti Nurhaliza was accompanied by two male dancers in a white background studio.

Siti Nurhaliza II was reported to have sold more than 350,000 units in Malaysia and 500,000 units in Indonesia.

== Track listing ==
No.	Title	Writer(s)	Producer(s)	Length
1.	"Aku Cinta Padamu" ("I Love You")	Baiduri	LY	5:23
2.	"Wajah Kekasih" ("Lover's Face")	Hani M.J	Adnan Abu Hassan	5:16
3.	"Tirai Semalam" ("Yesterday's Veil")	S. Amin Shahab	Fauzi Marzuki	5:04
4.	"Demi Kasih Kita" ("For the Sake of Our Love")	Siti Nurhaliza	Adnan Abu Hassan	4:47
5.	"Kesilapanku, Keegoanmu" ("My Fault, Your Ego")	Baiduri	LY	5:25
6.	"Khayalan Cinta" ("The Fantasy of Love")	Ucu	Xiao Wong	5:09
7.	"Usah Diragui" ("Don't Doubt")	Habsah Hassan	Zul Mahat	4:53
8.	"Rindu di Antara Kita" ("The Longing Feeling Between Us"; featuring Ciang Teng)	Hani M.J, Ciang Teng	Adnan Abu Hassan	4:38
9.	"Bisikan Asmara" ("Whisper of Romance")	Amran Omar	Helen Yap	4:53
10.	"Sri Mersing" ("Mersing")	Copyright Control	Copyright Control	5:00
11.	"The Colour of My Love" (Bonus Track)	Arthur Ganov	David Foster	3:30
Total length:				53:58

VCD Version
No.	Title	Writer(s)	Producer(s)	Length
1.	"Aku Cinta Padamu"	Baiduri	LY	5:23
2.	"Wajah Kekasih"	Hani M.J	Adnan Abu Hassan	5:16
3.	"Tirai Semalam"	S. Amin Shahab	Fauzi Marzuki	5:04
4.	"Demi Kasih Kita"	Siti Nurhaliza	Adnan Abu Hassan	4:47
5.	"Kesilapanku, Keegoanmu"	Baiduri	LY	5:25
6.	"Khayalan Cinta"	Ucu	Xiao Wong	5:09
7.	"Usah Diragui"	Habsah Hassan	Zul Mahat	4:53
8.	"Rindu di Antara Kita" (featuring Ciang Teng)	Hani M.J, Ciang Teng	Adnan Abu Hassan	4:38
9.	"Bisikan Asmara"	Amran Omar	Helen Yap	4:53
10.	"Sri Mersing"	Copyright Control	Copyright Control	5:00

Indonesia Version
No.	Title	Writer(s)	Producer(s)	Length
1.	"Betapa Kucinta Padamu"	Baiduri	LY	5:23
2.	"Wajah Kekasih"	Hani M.J	Adnan Abu Hassan	5:16
3.	"Bisikan Asmara"	Amran Omar	Helen Yap	4:53
4.	"Kesilapanku, Keegoanmu"	Baiduri	LY	5:25
5.	"The Colour of My Love"	Arthur Ganov	David Foster	3:30
6.	"Aku Cinta Padamu"	Baiduri	LY	5:23
7.	"Demi Kasih Kita"	Siti Nurhaliza	Adnan Abu Hassan	4:47
8.	"Khayalan Cinta"	Ucu	Xiao Wong	5:09
9.	"Usah Diragui"	Habsah Hassan	Zul Mahat	4:53
10.	"Tirai Semalam"	S. Amin Shahab	Fauzi Marzuki	5:04

== Credits ==
Credits adapted from Siti Nurhaliza II booklet liner notes.

- Aidiet – guitar
- Ariffin – promotional unit
- Azmeer – keyboard
- Baiduri – songwriter
- Bong – bass
- Kesuma Booty – programming, guitar
- Chobib – guitar
- David Foster – producer
- Arthur Ganov – songwriter
- Habsah Hassan – songwriter
- Adnan Abu Hassan – producer, programming
- A.D. Ho – photography
- Sham Amir Hussain – creation
- Jason Foo – production coordinator
- Zul Mahat – producer
- Zulkefli Majid – A & R coordinator
- Mahmud – percussion
- Fauzi Marzuki – producer, programming, guitar
- Hani M.J – songwriter
- Jari – saxophone
- Siti Nurhaliza – songwriter
- Nurul – make-up, hair stylist
- Lau – engineer, mixing
- LY – producer
- Amran Omar – songwriter
- Rahayu – promotional unit
- Riz – promotional unit
- Sabariah – promotional unit (Singapore)
- S. Amin Shahab – songwriter
- Soon – creation
- S.L. Tan – executive producer
- Ciang Teng – songwriter, vocals
- Ucu – songwriter
- Vincent – engineer, mixing
- Wong – engineer, mixing
- Xiao Wong – producer
- Helen Yap – producer, programming, piano
