= Cindai =

Studio album by Siti Nurhaliza
- Released: 17 November 1997
- Recorded: 1997
- Genres: Ethnic, folk, traditional
- Length: 45:02
- Label: Suria Records
- Producers: Pak Ngah, Rahim Jantan, S. Atan

Siti Nurhaliza chronology
| Siti Nurhaliza II (1997) | Cindai (1997) | Adiwarna (1998) |

Singles from Cindai
- 1. "Cindai" Released: 1997; 2. "Joget Pahang" Released: 1997; 3. "Joget Berhibur" Released: 1997

Cindai is the third studio album by the Malaysian pop singer Siti Nurhaliza, released on 17 November 1997 by Suria Records. It is one of her two studio albums that released in 1997, the other being her self-titled second studio album. Cindai was the first attempt by Siti to sing traditional Malay folk songs. It was the most memorable album in the 1990s for its impact on the Malaysian music industry. The album was Siti Nurhaliza's first album to have a title track, which has been nominated for the best song in the 1990s.

== Recording ==
Cindai was Siti Nurhaliza's first collaboration with Suhaimi Mohd Zain, professionally known as Pak Ngah, as the album producer and became her first full traditional album. It was produced after the success of her two self-titled albums.

Following the success of her first traditional Malay song, "Sri Mersing" in her album Siti Nurhaliza II, Siti Nurhaliza recorded a fully traditional Malay album. Most of the songs were traditional compositions, with only two originals, namely "Cindai" and "Joget Berhibur". The other songs were produced with new arrangements.

== Musical style ==
Cindai on which Siti Nurhaliza is accompanied by an acoustic band for the traditional feel and adopted the zapin rhythm.

== Release and reception ==
Cindai was released on 17 November 1997, eleven months after Siti Nurhaliza II. She later emphasized traditional Malay music on her later albums, Seri Balas (a duet album with Noraniza Idris; 1999), Sahmura (2000), Sanggar Mustika (2002) and Lentera Timur (2008).

To promote the album, three songs – "Cindai", "Joget Pahang" and "Joget Berhibur" - were released and later received music videos. She also performed the title song, "Cindai", as part of her special performance during the 1998 Commonwealth Games. Cindai was a commercial success and sold over 400,000 copies on its release and was certified 5× platinum. "Cindai" has also been translated into Mandarin sung by the Chinese singer Chien Bai Hui, though some of the lyrics remained untranslated, in which Chien claimed that she could not alter them due to their perceived beautiful and poetic composition.

On 1 April 2005, she sang Cindai as a part of a medley of Zapin songs along with Mahligai Permata and Ya Maulai at the end of Irama Malaysia segments of her solo concert at the Royal Albert Hall, London. Siti Nurhaliza also performs "Cindai" as part of the fourth medley (traditional) in her SATU concert in Istana Budaya in June 2009 and her Konsert Lentera Timur in October 2013 respectively, the song also performed by Siti at her recent concert, Dato' Siti Nurhaliza & Friends Concert in April 2016.

== Critical response ==
Initial reception for the album was mixed. Some critics were calling the album as ""synthesizer-oriented" asli album". In a 3-star review by Zainal Alam Kadir of New Straits Times, he acknowledged that although Siti is a versatile singer, Cindai "does sound like a rushed job". He too criticized the presence of too much synthesized sounds.

== Track listing ==
| No. | Title | Writer(s) | Producer(s) | Length |
|---|---|---|---|---|
| 1. | "Cindai" | Hairul Anuar Harun | Pak Ngah | 4:52 |
| 2. | "Laksamana Mati Dibunuh" | Copyright Control | Copyright Control | 5:20 |
| 3. | "Janji" | Copyright Control | Copyright Control | 3:17 |
| 4. | "Lela Manja" | Copyright Control | Copyright Control | 4:12 |
| 5. | "Kaparinyo" | Copyright Control | Copyright Control | 4:20 |
| 6. | "Es Lilin" | Copyright Control | Copyright Control | 3:56 |
| 7. | "Damak" | Copyright Control | Copyright Control | 4:28 |
| 8. | "Joget Pahang" | Copyright Control | Copyright Control | 3:51 |
| 9. | "Patah Hati" | Copyright Control | Copyright Control | 5:11 |
| 10. | "Joget Berhibur" | Syed Indera Syed Omar (Siso) | Rahim Jantan | 4:35 |
| Total length: | | | | 45:02 |

== Credits and personnel ==
Credits adapted from Cindai booklet liner notes.

- Ariffin – promotional unit
- S. Atan – producer, mixing, accordion, guitar, keyboard
- Bard – promotional unit
- Hairul Anuar Harun – songwriter
- Sham Amir Hussain – A & R manager
- Rizalman Ibrahim – apparel
- Hana Creative Image – image
- Rahim Jantan – producer
- Joe – promotional unit
- Joey – make-up
- Azizul Khamis – vocals
- Khairul Khamis – vocals
- Mazlina Khamis – vocals
- Weng Kong – photography
- Lau – engineer
- Tan Su Loke – executive producer
- Mohar – flute
- Mustafa Musa – rebana
- Nieta – promotional unit
- Andy Pok – mastering
- AS Design & Print – creation
- Syed Indera Syed Omar (Siso) – songwriter, vocals
- Rosnan – marwas, tabla
- Tina – promotional unit
- Vincent – engineer, mixing
- Wong – engineer, mixing
- Zainuddin Mohd Yunos – marwas, rebana, vocals
- Suhaimi Mohd Zain (Pak Ngah) – producer, mixing, accordion, guitar, keyboard, marwas, rebana, vocals

== Awards ==
| Competition | Award |
|---|---|
| Anugerah Juara Lagu | Winner Best Creative Ethnic – Cindai |
| Anugerah Juara Lagu | Juara Lagu – Cindai |
| Anugerah Juara Lagu | Best Performance |

- 5 Platinum Album "Cindai"
