= Jerat Percintaan =

Single by Siti Nurhaliza

from the album Siti Nurhaliza
- Released: 1996
- Genre: Slow Rock, Pop
- Length: 4:55
- Label: Suria Records
- Songwriters: Adnan Abu Hassan, Othman Zainuddin, Hani M.J.
- Producer: Adnan Abu Hassan

Siti Nurhaliza singles chronology
"Jerat Percintaan" (1996)	"Cari-Cari" (1996)

Audio sample
- A music sample of Siti Nurhaliza's debut single "Jerat Percintaan" which earn her to win the Anugerah Juara Lagu in 1996.: file; help

Music video
- Jerat Percintaan on YouTube

"Jerat Percintaan" (in English: "Love Snare" or "Love Trap") is the first single and award-winning song performed by Malaysian pop singer Siti Nurhaliza. It earned the Best Song award at the Anugerah Industri Muzik in 1997.

The song previously won Best Performance, Ballad Song Champion as well as Song Champion awards at the Anugerah Juara Lagu in 1996. During this competition, Siti faced strong competitors such as Ziana Zain and Fauziah Latiff. Anugerah Juara Lagu is a competition held by TV3.

== Song ==
The melody to "Jerat Percintaan" was composed by Adnan Abu Hassan and lyrics written by Othman Zainuddin and Hani M.J.

== Release and reception ==
"Jerat Percintaan" was released as the main track of Siti Nurhaliza I in 1996. It was well-received and became one of her signature songs.

== Awards ==
=== Anugerah Juara Lagu ===
Year	Recipient/Nominated works	Category	Result
1996	"Jerat Percintaan"	Best Ballad	Won
1996	"Jerat Percintaan"	Best Performance	Won
1996	"Jerat Percintaan"	Song Champion	Won

=== Anugerah Industri Muzik ===
Year	Recipient/Nominated works	Category	Result
1997	"Jerat Percintaan"	Best Song	Won
