= Kevin Field =

New Zealand jazz pianist and composer

Kevin Field is a New Zealand jazz pianist and composer.

== Biography ==
Field has a PhD from the University of Auckland. Kevin Field's early career included collaborations with saxophonist Nathan Haines on Haines' albums Shift Left, Soundkilla Sessions Vol 1, and Sound Travels. In 2003 he released his debut album Dangerous Curves documenting his compositional style within a piano trio context. This was followed by a collaborative album Irony with Canadian drummer Ron Samsom and German bassist Olivier Holland on the Rattle record label (2009). In between, Field was active as a pianist for other artists including vocalist Whirimako Black whose award winning album Sings he features on as musical director and pianist.

In 2012 Warner Music released Field's third album Field of Vision. A largely collaborative recording with Field featured on both acoustic piano and fender rhodes, this album includes performances from vocalists Kevin Mark Trail (UK), Bex Nabouta (NZ), and Marjan Gorgani (Iran/NZ). Nathan Haines also features on saxophone and produced the album.

Field has also reunited with Haines on the saxophonist's 2012 release The Poet's Embrace and 2013's Vermillion Skies both on Warner Music.

Field's album The A List recorded with New York musicians Nir Felder (guitar), Matt Penman (bass) and Obed Calvaire (drums) is due for release in mid 2015.
