= Prasasti Seni =

Studio album by Siti Nurhaliza
- Released: 12 April 2004
- Recorded: 2003–2004
- Genre: Pop
- Length: 54:38
- Label: Suria Records
- Producers: Tan Su Loke (Executive producer), Aidit Alfian, Zuriani, Iman Wan, Andy Flop Poppy, Ajai, Yasin, Mohar, Along Exists, Helen Yap, Pongky Jikustik & Aubrey Suwito

Siti Nurhaliza chronology
Anugerah Aidilfitri (2003)	Prasasti Seni (2004)	Transkripsi (2006)

Prasasti Seni is the eleventh studio album from Malaysian pop singer-songwriter Siti Nurhaliza. The album was released on 12 April 2004 in Malaysia, Singapore and Brunei and at a later time in Indonesia on 23 May 2004. This album also includes a heart-shaped VCD that features a video message from Siti and a video clip of "Pejam Matamu". Notable singles include "Dialah Di Hati", which is also nominated in Best Song category in Anugerah Industri Muzik, "Lagu Rindu" & "Seindah Biasa".

== Production ==
Prasasti Seni was heavily influenced by Siti Nurhaliza. Prasasti, a Malay loanword from Sanskrit carries the meaning of "stone inscription" or "a marker signifying existence". (Note: Original:"batu bersurat atau tanda yang mencatat sejarah kewujudan") She explained the rationale on chosen the title as, "Songs that are sung by me are my marks of existence in the local music scene. The title of the album is very significant to me in divulging what I have kept in my heart for my beloved fans." (Note: Original:"Lagu-lagu nyanyian Siti merupakan tanda kewujudan Siti dalam arena seni tanah air. Judul album berkenaan signifikan sekali untuk Siti meluahkan apa yang tersurat di hati Siti buat peminat-peminat tercinta.")

== Artwork ==
The album cover photography was designed by Rauna Jud and filmed in Janda Baik, Pahang. The cover depicts Siti Nurhaliza styling a white gown. It was also nominated for the Best Album Cover at the 2005 Anugerah Industri Muzik.

== Release and reception ==
Prasasti Seni was released on 12 April 2004 in Malaysia, Singapore and Brunei and later in Indonesia on 23 May 2004. To promote the album, "Seindah Biasa" was released as the first single in the album. This was later followed by "Dialah di Hati" (second single), "Lagu Rindu" (third single) and "Pendirianku" (fourth single). The album was well received by fans as more than 100,000 units and 700,000 units were sold in both Malaysian and Indonesian markets respectively.

== Critical response ==
Prasasti Seni was well received by music critics. Many of the critics reviewed her vocals in the album favourably. Faridul Anwar Farinordin of New Straits Times gave the album three and half stars. He praised the new direction of the album as "fresh" and "more adult contemporary". Echoing similar points made by Faridul, Jad Mahidin of Sunday Mail also agreed that Siti has matured musically and gave the album a four-star review. In a glowing review by Meor Shariman of The Malay Mail, he praised the album as one of her best, commending it as "better than her award-winning E.M.A.S". Reviewer from Harian Metro also reviewed the album as a better album than its predecessor and praised Siti for venturing into fresher new sounds.

== Track listing ==
No.	Title	Lyrics	Music	Length
1.	"Introduksi Siti"			0:38
2.	"Dialah di Hati"	Habsah Hassan	Aidit Alfian	4:22
3.	"Pendirianku"	M. Zulkifli	Zuriani	3:59
4.	"Cinta Tak Berganti"	Siti Nurhaliza	Iman Wan	4:46
5.	"Cahaya Seribu Liku"	Siti Nurhaliza, Tanty	Andy Flop Poppy	4:22
6.	"Hanya Dirimu"	Hani MJ	Ajai	4:34
7.	"Lagu Rindu"	Yasin	Yasin	4:33
8.	"Sakti"	Loloq	Mohar	6:26
9.	"Pejam Matamu"	Siti Nurhaliza	G Nola	4:52
10.	"Kembalikan Indah"	Siti Nurhaliza, Slen	Helen Yap	5:01
11.	"Ku Menunggu"	Habsah Hassan	Aidit Alfian	5:00
12.	"Seindah Biasa"	Ponky Jikustik	Ponky Jikustik	4:48
13.	"Pasti Seni : Siti"			1:17

Bonus VCD
No.	Title	Writer(s)	Producer(s)	Length
1.	"Intro: Siti"
2.	"Pejam Matamu"	Siti Nurhaliza	G Nola	4:52

== Awards ==
Year	Awards	Categories
2005	Anugerah Industri Muzik	Best Vocal Performance in an Album (Female)
2005	Anugerah Industri Muzik	Best Musical Arrangement in a Song ("Seindah Biasa")
2005	Hitz1	Most Popular Song ("Lagu Rindu")
2005	Hitz1	Second place for Best Song ("Lagu Rindu")
2005	Anugerah Planet Muzik	Most Popular Song ("Lagu Rindu")
