= Muara Hati =

Single by Hafiz Suip and Siti Nurhaliza

from the album Luahan Hati Anak Seni
- Released: 19 December 2012
- Recorded: July–August 2012
- Genre: Pop
- Length: 3:45
- Label: Siti Nurhaliza Production, Universal Music Group (Malaysia), Astro Entertainment
- Songwriter: Manusia Putih (a.k.a. Adi Sixth Sense/Adi Priya Sambodo)
- Producer: Manusia Putih (Adi Sixth Sense/Adi Priya Sambodo)

Hafiz Suip singles chronology
"Hadirkan Aku Dalam Ingatan" (2012)	"Muara Hati" (2012)	"Kita Satu" (2012)

Siti Nurhaliza singles chronology
"Remember You" (2012)	"Muara Hati" (2012)	"Galau" (2013)

Muara Hati (Estuary of the Heart) is a song by Malaysian artists Siti Nurhaliza and Hafiz Suip, where it was composed entirely as a theme song for an 80-episode Malaysian drama, Adam & Hawa. The song was composed entirely by Manusia Putih, or more commonly known as Adi Sixth Sense a year earlier in 2011. However, after being approached by the drama's executive producer, Zetty Adila Ramli, he finally agreed to write a lyric based on the script that was given to him and before later releasing it as a proper song.

To promote the song, Hafiz first performed a single version of the song at Astro's Iftar and Eid-ul-Fitr screening ceremony on 1 August 2012 . Siti on the other hand first performed the song as a single version at her 2012 concert in Gambang on 11 November. The duo later performed the song together live for the first time six days later at the 19th Anugerah Industri Muzik on 17 November 2012.

The music video, directed by Ghaz Abu Bakar, was released officially on YouTube on 17 August 2012. On 18 October 2013, "Muara Hati" won two out of three nominations from Anugerah Planet Muzik 2013 (which involved participants and songs from Malaysia, Indonesia and Singapore) in the category of Best Duo/Group and Regional Most Popular Song.

== Background and recording ==
Muara (estuary) is the meeting place between river and sea, thus the meeting of Adam and Hawa can be taken as a(n) [metaphor of an] estuary.
—Adi on composing the lyric for the song.

The song was recorded somewhere from July to August 2012, for when Hafiz first performed the song Astro's Iftar and Eid-ul-Fitr screening ceremony, the song is still in recording and mastering processes. The song was composed by Adi in 2011 and it was kept until he was approached by one of Adam & Hawa's executive producers, Zetty Adila Ramly who would like to have Adi composing a theme song for the drama. Adi wrote the lyric for the song after he was given a copy of the script earlier. And after few hearings, Siti was pleased with the melody of the song and after a meeting, the song was turned into a duet.

One of the challenges that he had to face when recording the song was that he has to make sure that the song is suitable to Siti's and Hafiz's different vocal ranges. The song which was recorded from July to August fell on the period of Ramadan where the two artists have to find a suitable day to record the song when the two are really free from other activities.

== Composition and lyrics ==
A moderate ballad, the song lasts for three minutes and forty five seconds. The whole lyrics was inspired by the storyline of television series which was about two lovers who were separated after they were forced into marriage by their parents after they were slandered of committing adultery.

== Release and promotion ==
Though the song was officially released as digital download on 19 December 2012, the song was first performed by Hafiz as a solo version three months earlier at Astro's Iftar and Eid-ul-Fitr screening ceremony on 1 August 2012. However, during that time, the song still hasn't been properly recorded and mastered yet, and both Siti and Hafiz are still required to go back to rerecord any parts that they can further amend. Later, Siti also performed a solo version of the song on 11 November during her concert in Gambang. And finally, on 18 November 2012, they finally performed the song together live for the first time at the 19th Anugerah Industri Muzik.

== Music video ==
=== Background ===
The video was recorded in August 2012, and it was directed by Ghaz Abu Bakar and filmed at Malaysia Multimedia University. The concept for the video was black and white, which was inspired by Karl Lagerfeld's Chanel Autumn/Winter collection. Because of differences in their schedules, the whole video was shot at different times for Hafiz and Siti, where Hafiz's scenes were shot earlier than Siti's. On 17 August 2012, the music video was released through Astro's official YouTube channel, followed by a behind-the-scenes clip a week later on 24 August.

=== Synopsis ===
As the video opens, it shows Hafiz and Siti were sitting on a transparent plastic chair with different background - Siti with white background and Hafiz with the black one. Apart from the transparent plastic chair, the other prop that unites the two different background is the crystal chandelier that was hanging in both Siti's and Hafiz's scenes. For both Hafiz and Siti, they only wore one single black ensemble respectively throughout all the scenes. Throughout the video, the scenes' shots vary from long shot, medium shot to close-up. After the opening, the music video begins with Hafiz's scenes sitting on a chair before it fades to Siti's scenes who is also shown on the same transparent chair. There were moments when the two scenes are put together side by side or one above the other, but both artists were never in one same scene. It was intended that way by Ghaz to show the concept of separation and how each one of them is longing for each other, but they were separated by boundaries that kept them far from one another.

=== Reception ===
Within ten days of the video release, it already garnered 170,000 views, and as of February 2013, after six months of release, the video has attracted more than four million views and was ranked 8th in YouTube Malaysia's most watched video.

== Awards ==
=== Anugerah Planet Muzik ===
Year	Nominee / work	Award	Result
2013	Siti Nurhaliza and Hafiz	Best Duo/Group	Won
2013	"Muara Hati"	Regional Most Popular Song	Won
2013	"Muara Hati"	Malaysia's Best Song	Nominated

== Format and track listing ==
- Digital download
1. "Muara Hati" – 3:45

== Radio and Release history ==
Country	Date	Format	Label
Malaysia	August 2012	Contemporary hit radio	Siti Nurhaliza Production, Universal Music Group (Malaysia), Astro Entertainment
Malaysia	19 December 2012	digital download	Siti Nurhaliza Production, Universal Music Group (Malaysia), Astro Entertainment
