= Adiwarna =

Studio album by Siti Nurhaliza
- Released: 29 June 1998
- Recorded: 1997–1998
- Genres: Pop, dance, R&B, pop rock
- Length: 46:45
- Label: Suria Records
- Producers: Azmeer, L.Y., Malek Osman, Adnan Abu Hassan, Salman, Ferdi Khalid NS, Azlan Abu Hassan, Johari Teh, Zuriani

Siti Nurhaliza chronology
Cindai (1997)	Adiwarna (1998)	Seri Balas (1999)

Singles from Adiwarna
- 1. "Purnama Merindu" Released: 1998; 2. "Diari Hatimu" Released: 1998; 3. "Satu Cinta Dua Jiwa" Released: 1998; 4. "Sendiri" Released: 1998

Adiwarna is the fourth studio album by Malaysian pop singer Siti Nurhaliza, released on 29 June 1998 by Suria Records. "Purnama Merindu", the first one recorded for the album, was released as the first single. "Diari Hatimu" was originally intended for her second album, but never made it then, so, it is re-recorded for the album. Siti Nurhaliza wrote the lyrics for the second song, entitled "Lagu Ku Di Hatimu". The album has been selected for the Best Album of the Year during the 6th Anugerah Industri Muzik in 1999. It has also received 4 Platinum Award for its successful sales.

== Production ==
Adiwarna was recorded by Siti Nurhaliza, with her mentor Adnan Abu Hassan handling the arrangement and composed three songs. The album containing 10 songs, Siti once again collaborating with Adnan, LY, Johari Teh and Azmeer and other composers, while explaining her new album gave a thousand of meanings.

In an interview with Utusan Malaysia on 20 June 1998, Siti said she choose Adiwarna, which means "very good" or "very beautiful" (Note: Original:"amat bagus atau amat indah") as the title for her fourth solo album, while explaining that the term to describe all beauties in art of music that should be featured. Besides that, she said Adiwarna is also a diversity of art in an album as trying to show this time. She said: "This is not the traditional album but ordinary pop album, simply titled only a relatively classic and Malay heritage,". (Note: Original:"Ini bukan album asli tetapi album pop biasa, cuma judulnya sahaja yang agak klasik dan kemelayuan,") By selecting Malay elements term as the title of the album, Siti had opportunity to re-popularize many old word that has been forgotten.

In the album, there is a song called "Lagu Ku di Hatimu", composed by Salman and lyrics by Siti herself. This song was quite popular among many people due to its lyrics revolved on honesty.

== Release and reception ==
Adiwarna was released on 29 June 1998, just six months after Siti Nurhaliza set up her company bearing her name, Siti Nurhaliza Productions, the album was a commercial success. Over 200,000 units sold, Adiwarna also peaked at number one on RIM's local album chart. The album later sold more than 300,000 units in Indonesian market.

To promote the album, four songs in the album – "Purnama Merindu", "Diari Hatimu", "Satu Cinta Dua Jiwa" and "Sendiri" was released as the main singles and later made into music videos. Her further singles – "Lagu Ku Di Hatimu", "Demi Kasih Sayang", "Kita Kan Bersama" and "Gelora Asmara" also were made into music videos. "Satu Cinta Dua Jiwa", the third single in the album were translated into English as "We'll be as One". It was later on sent for the South Pacific International Song and Singing Competition held in Australia which made her to receive 2 awards.

The album's fourth single, "Sendiri" was released in Indonesia and retitled as "Mencintaimu Selamanya". "Diari Hatimu", the second single in the album faced criticism when Siti accused for plagiarism to the song owing the similarities with "Rindang Tak Berbuah" sung by Indonesian singer, Kirey. However, the controversy began to answered when the composer, Ferdi Khalid NS is the same person who composed both songs, for the Malaysian version, the music and lyrics was rearranged while the melody remains unchanged.

== Critical response ==
Zainal Alam Kadir, writing for New Straits Times gave Adiwarna a 3-star rating. He called the songs in the album as ordinary, but since they were sung by Siti, they sounded fresh and different.

== Track listing ==
No.	Title	Writer(s)	Producer(s)	Length
1.	"Purnama Merindu"	Lukhman S	Azmeer	4:24
2.	"Sendiri"	Baiduri	L.Y.	5:33
3.	"Kita Kan Bersama"	Sham Amir Hussain	Malek Osman	3:50
4.	"Tak Rela Berpisah Dari Mu"	Hani MJ	Adnan Abu Hassan	5:14
5.	"Lagu Ku Di Hati Mu"	Siti Nurhaliza	Salman	4:32
6.	"Diari Hatimu"	Ferdi Khalid NS	Ferdi Khalid NS	6:00
7.	"Satu Cinta Dua Jiwa"	Ucu	Azlan Abu Hassan	4:05
8.	"Demi Kasih Sayang"	Baiduri	L.Y.	4:02
9.	"Tak Boleh Lupa"	Juwie	Johari Teh	4:47
10.	"Gelora Asmara"	Hazida	Adnan Abu Hassan	4:18
Total length:				46:45

Indonesia Version
No.	Title	Writer(s)	Producer(s)	Length
1.	"Mencintaimu Selamanya"	Baiduri	L.Y.	5:33
2.	"Purnama Merindu"	Lukhman S	Azmeer	4:24
3.	"Kita Kan Bersama"	Sham Amir Hussain	Malek Osman	3:50
4.	"Tak Rela Berpisah Dari Mu"	Hani MJ	Adnan Abu Hassan	5:14
5.	"Lagu Ku Di Hati Mu"	Siti Nurhaliza	Salman	4:32
6.	"Diari Hatimu"	Ferdi Khalid NS	Ferdi Khalid NS	6:00
7.	"Satu Cinta Dua Jiwa"	Ucu	Azlan Abu Hassan	4:05
8.	"Demi Kasih Sayang"	Baiduri	L.Y.	4:02
9.	"Tak Boleh Lupa"	Juwie	Johari Teh	4:47
10.	"Gelora Asmara"	Hazida	Adnan Abu Hassan	4:18
Total length:				46:45

== Credits and personnel ==
Credits adapted from Adiwarna booklet liner notes.

- Andy – photography
- Ariffin – promotional unit
- Azmeer – producer
- Baiduri – songwriter
- Bard – promotional unit
- Adnan Abu Hassan – producer
- Azlan Abu Hassan – producer
- Hazida – songwriter
- Sham Amir Hussain – A & R manager, songwriter
- Hana Creative Image – image
- Joe – promotional unit
- Joey – make-up, hair stylist
- Juwie – songwriter
- Lau – engineer
- L.Y. – producer
- Tan Su Loke – executive producer
- Hani MJ – songwriter
- Nieta – promotional unit
- Siti Nurhaliza – songwriter
- Ferdi Khalid NS – producer, songwriter
- Malek Osman – producer
- Andy Pok – mastering
- AS Design & Print – creation
- Lukhman S – songwriter
- Salman – producer
- Johari Teh – producer
- Tina – promotional unit
- Ucu – songwriter
- Vincent – engineer, mixing
- Wong – engineer, mixing
- Zuriani – producer

== Awards ==
AIM 1999

- Best Female Vocal Performance
- Best Pop Album (Adiwarna)
- Best Album (Adiwarna)

Asia Pacific Song Competition (Australia) 1999

- Best Female Vocal Performance (We’ll Be As One)
- Winner of the Pop/Top 40 International Song Chart – We'll Be As One

Anugerah Juara Lagu 1999

- Best Ballad (Purnama Merindu)

Shanghai Music Festival (China) 1999

- Gold Winner (Purnama Merindu)

Anugerah Carta RIM

- Best Sold Malay Album (Adiwarna)

Voice of Asia (Kazakhstan)

- Grand Prix Winner (Purnama Merindu)
