= Transkripsi =

Studio album by Siti Nurhaliza
- Released: 23 April 2006
- Genre: Pop
- Length: 58:04
- Labels: SNP, Suria
- Producers: Siti Nurhaliza, Aubrey Suwito, Jenny Chin, Mac Chew, Yasin, Cat Farish, Firdaus Mahmud, Damian VE

Siti Nurhaliza chronology
Prasasti Seni (2004)	Transkripsi (2006)	Hadiah Daripada Hati (2007)

Singles from Transkripsi
- 1. "Biarlah Rahsia" Released: April 2006; 2. "Bisakah"; 3. "Siti Situ Sana Sini"; 4. "Bila Harus Memilih"; 5. "Pastikan"; 6. "Destinasi Cinta"

Professional ratings
Review scores
Source	Rating
ERA	link
Klik	5/5 stars
New Straits Times	link
Sultan Muzaffar	link

Transkripsi is the twelfth studio album from Malaysian pop singer-songwriter Siti Nurhaliza and has been touted as Malaysia's Best Album of 2006. It also hailed as Siti's best album ever. The album was released on 23 April 2006 in Malaysia, Singapore and Brunei and at a later time in Indonesia. Siti performed the first single, "Biarlah Rahsia", at the Anugerah Planet Muzik in 2006 which was aired live from Singapore, weeks before the actual release date. The album features of what Siti describes as "the assemble of emotions or feelings which combined as one for as long as we live". The album has sold over 80 thousand copies. The album has been nominated for the Best Vocal Performance in an Album (Female), Best Album Cover and Best Music Video, won Best Pop Album and Best Album at the Anugerah Industri Muzik in 2007.

This album became Siti Nurhaliza's first album to be produced by her own company, Siti Nurhaliza Productions (SNP) after she left Suria Records in 2005, but Suria Records remains as the distributor of her albums until Tahajjud Cinta.

== Track listing ==
No.	Title	Lyrics	Music	Length
1.	"Siti Situ Sana Sini"	Cham VE	Damian VE, Lah VE	4.06
2.	"Biarlah Rahsia"	Siti Nurhaliza	Melly Goeslaw	4.09
3.	"Destinasi Cinta"	PSNN	Lin Li Zhen	3.24
4.	"Cuba Untuk Mengerti"	Tengku Shafiek	Tengku Shafiek	4.45
5.	"Hidup Penuh Bicara"	Yasin & Eena Houzyama	Yasin	3.59
6.	"Bila Harus Memilih"	Glenn Fredly	Glenn Fredly	4.23
7.	"Pastikan"	Melly Goeslaw	Melly Goeslaw	4.22
8.	"Hati Berbisik"	Siti Nurhaliza	Siti Nurhaliza & Aubrey Suwito	4.10
9.	"Rupanya Kita Serupa"	Cat Farish	Cat Farish	4.56
10.	"Tanpa Dendam di Hati"	Habsah Hassan	Erwin Gutawa	4.15
11.	"Intrig Cinta"	Loloq	Siti Nurhaliza	4.04
12.	"Impiankan Nyata"	Rauf	Abdul Rahim Bachik, Rauf & Firdaus Mahmud	3.40
13.	"Bisakah"	Tessh RS	Aubrey Suwito	4.39

== Charts ==
=== Album ===
Year	Chart	Position
2007	Top 10 best-selling local albums of 2006	2

=== Singles ===
Year	Single	Chart	Peak position
2006	"Biarlah Rahsia"	Carta ERA, Hot FM, Suria FM	1
2006	"Bisakah"	MTV Jus, Muzik Muzik, Hits 1, Suria FM	1
2006	"Siti Situ Sana Sini"	Carta ERA, Hot FM, X-Fresh FM, Suria FM	1
2006	"Bila Harus Memilih"	Hot FM 30, Suria FM	1
2007	"Pastikan"	Carta ERA, Hot FM, Xfresh FM, Suria FM	1
2007	"Destinasi Cinta"	Carta ERA, Hot FM, Suria FM	11, (Note: Destinasi Cinta is the only song in the Transkripsi album which is not charted in first place in Carta Era due to lack of vote from listeners as a result of competition from Hot FM which is the Era FM’s main rival.) 1

== Awards ==
=== 2007 ===
Awards Ceremony	Award
Anugerah Industri Muzik	Best Pop Album
Anugerah Industri Muzik	Best Album
Anugerah Planet Muzik	Best Song ("Biarlah Rahsia")
Anugerah Planet Muzik	Best Female Artist
Anugerah Planet Muzik	Choice Female Artist
