= E.M.A.S. =

E.M.A.S

Studio album by Siti Nurhaliza
- Released: 3 March 2003
- Recorded: 2002–2003
- Genre: Pop
- Length: 44:43
- Label: Suria Records
- Producers: Tan Su Loke (Executive producer), Aubrey Suwito, Helen Yap, Zulkefli Majid, Aidit Alfian, Azmeer, Zuraini, Julfekar, Ajai & Wong

Siti Nurhaliza chronology
Sanggar Mustika (2002)	E.M.A.S (2003)	Anugerah Aidilfitri (2003)

E.M.A.S, (i.e. "gold", but also as a stylism for "Edaran Muzik Aspirasi Semasa"), is the ninth studio album from Malaysian pop singer-songwriter Siti Nurhaliza. The album was released on 3 March 2003 in Malaysia, Singapore and Brunei and at a later time in Indonesia. This album also includes a mini-VCD that features a video message from Siti and 2 video clips of "Bukan Cinta Biasa" and "Ku Milikmu".

Another notable singles include "Debaran Cinta" & "Sebenar Cinta". E.M.A.S has been the most successful album in Siti's career as a singer. The album has sold over 300,000 copies in Indonesia. The album received quite a number of prestigious awards.

In addition to Siti's career, she wrote the lyrics for five songs on the album.

The album has been nominated for the Best Album Cover, won Best Vocal Performance in an Album (Female), Best Musical Arrangement in a Song ("Bukan Cinta Biasa"), Best Pop Album and Best Album at the Anugerah Industri Muzik in 2004.

== Production ==
Siti Nurhaliza telling about the inspiration for E.M.A.S:

"E.M.A.S (Edaran Muzik Aspirasi Semasa) was produced based on my observation on the contemporary music releases. Each day [and] each year, taste [in music] is changing and I have too find suitable ideas so that each album that I release can be accepted by all." (Note: Original:" E.M.A.S (Edaran Muzik Aspirasi Semasa) terhasil di atas pengamatan Siti mengenai peredaran arus muzik semasa. Saban hari saban tahun, citarasa semakin berubah dan Siti juga harus mencari idea-idea yang bersesuaian agar setiap album yang Siti keluarkan dapat diterima oleh semua pihak.")

The album was her second album to be produced by Aubrey Suwito after Safa (2001), with Tan Su Loke as the executive producer. Other producers include Helen Yap, Zulkefli Majid, Aidit Alfian, Azmeer, Zuraini, Julfekar, Ajai & Wong. Siti also contributed lyrics for five songs.

== Reception and critical response ==
To promote the launch and release of E.M.A.S in Indonesia, Siti embarked on a 6-day promotional tour including being invited as guests for well-known Indonesian television shows. E.M.A.S met positive reviews from Malaysian music critics. Zul Husni of Berita Harian reviewed the album as a proof of Siti's maturity after more than 8 years in the music industry. A reviewer for Harian Metro praised Siti for maintaining her standard in giving her best when singing any songs. In a favourable review by Jad Mahidin of Sunday Mail, he gave the album a four-star rating. He said the album was "enjoyable" from start to finish and praised her "impressive vocal work throughout the album". Suzan Ahmad of Berita Minggu also echoed Jad's opinion in praising Siti's vocals in the album.

== Track listing ==
No.	Title	Lyrics	Music	Length
1.	"Bukan Cinta Biasa"	Dewiq, Siti Nurhaliza	Dewiq, Siti Nurhaliza	4:23
2.	"Debaran Cinta"	Faridah A. Razak, Siti Nurhaliza	Zuraini	3:40
3.	"Untuk Selamanya"	Rashid S.	Julfekar	4:54
4.	"Ku Yakini"	Siti Nurhaliza	Helen Yap	4:58
5.	"Oda Bumi Anbia"	Ad Samad	Mat S. W	4:14
6.	"Janji Kasih"	Siti Nurhaliza	Aidit Alfian	5:00
7.	"Sebenar Cinta"	Siti Nurhaliza	Ajai	4:24
8.	"Airmata Ibu"	Ad Samad, Tanty	Aiman	4:20
9.	"Ku Milikmu"	Siti Nurhaliza	Zuraini, M. Zulkifli	3:36
10.	"Di Sini Ku Berjanji"	Senibayan	Azmeer	4:46

Bonus VCD
No.	Title	Writer(s)	Producer(s)	Length
1.	"Intro: Siti"
2.	"Bukan Cinta Biasa"	Dewiq, Siti Nurhaliza	Dewiq, Siti Nurhaliza	4:23
3.	"Ku Milikmu"	M. Zulkifli, Siti Nurhaliza	Zuraini	3:36

== Awards ==
=== 2003 ===
Awards Ceremony	Award
Indonesian Music Awards	Malaysian Best Album
Anugerah ERA	Chosen Music Video ("Bukan Cinta Biasa")
Anugerah Juara Lagu Ke-18	Best Performance ("Ku Milikmu")

=== 2004 ===
Awards Ceremony	Award
Anugerah Planet Muzik	Most Popular Song ("Bukan Cinta Biasa")
Anugerah Planet Muzik	Most Popular Singer
Anugerah Planet Muzik	Best Female Artist ("EMAS")
Anugerah Industri Muzik	Best Vocal Performance in an Album (Female)
Anugerah Industri Muzik	Best Musical Arrangement in an Album
Anugerah Industri Muzik	Best Pop Album
Anugerah Industri Muzik	Best Album
