= Lentera Timur =

Studio album by Siti Nurhaliza
- Released: 26 December 2008
- Recorded: 2008
- Length: 46:02
- Label: SNP, Suria
- Producer: Dato' Siti Nurhaliza, Adnan Abu Hassan, Aubrey Suwito, Fauzi Marzuki, Johan Nawawi, Johari Teh, Khairil Johari Johat, M. Nasir, S. Atan, Zul Mahat

Siti Nurhaliza chronology
| Hadiah Daripada Hati (2007) | Lentera Timur (2008) | Tahajjud Cinta (2009) |

Singles from Lentera Timur
- 1. "Di Taman Teman" Released: December 2008; 2. "Cinta Ini" Released: 2009; 3. "Ada Masa Mata" Released: 2009

Professional ratings
Review scores
| Source | Rating |
|---|---|
| Ed-Ahmad | link |
| The Bogus Circus | link |
| Era.fm | link |

Lentera Timur was the fourteenth studio album by Malaysian pop singer-songwriter Dato' Siti Nurhaliza which was released on 26 December 2008, four years after the 2004 Indian Ocean tsunami. It is the most anticipated album since her last traditional album, Sanggar Mustika, which was released in 2002. The album is set to sell more than 100,000 copies.

== Production ==
Lentera Timur contains eleven songs using composers from Malaysia and Indonesia. The production of the album has started since 2006, but due to lacking in materials the album has since been put on hold. With the help of MACP, Siti gathered enough materials from composers like Pak Ngah, M. Nasir, Adnan Abu Hassan, just to name a few, to produce a traditional contemporary album, Lentera Timur.

== Release and reception ==
The album was released on 26 December 2008, which was the 4th anniversary of the 2004 Indian Ocean tsunami, and was well received. It sell over 100,000 copies at the day of its release. Despite Lentera Timur's warm success, Siti Nurhaliza decided to take a break and would not record another traditional album until the release of Gema Bumantara in 2025.

== Track listing ==
The album was previously rumoured to contain twelve or more songs. When the album was released, however, one song composed by Radhi (OAG), Langit Masih Cerah didn't make it to the final cut. Aidit Alfian also confirmed his track didn't make to the final cut.

| No. | Title | Lyrics | Music | Length |
|---|---|---|---|---|
| 1. | "Di Kayangan Kita" | Keon | Johari Teh | 4.20 |
| 2. | "Bintang Malam" | Amran Omar | Johan Nawawi | 4.41 |
| 3. | "Cinta Ini" | Katon Bagaskara | Katon Bagaskara | 3.50 |
| 4. | "Ada Masa Mata" | Ad Samad | M. Nasir | 4.11 |
| 5. | "Bulan Yang Mesra" | Zubir Ali | Khairil Johari Johar | 5.09 |
| 6. | "Seloka Budi" | Azam Dungun | Adnan Abu Hassan | 3.28 |
| 7. | "Rasa Antara Kita" | Zubir Ali | Khairil Johari Johar | 4.23 |
| 8. | "Senyum Minang Manis" | Abot | Zul Mahat | 3.04 |
| 9. | "Joget Menanti Kasih" | Habsah Hassan | S. Atan | 3.16 |
| 10. | "Jelmakanlah Ayumu" | Siso Kopratasa | Pak Ngah | 4.39 |
| 11. | "Di Taman Teman" | Hairul Anuar Harun | Fauzi Marzuki | 4.48 |

== Awards ==
=== 2009 ===
| Awards Ceremony | Awards |
|---|---|
| Anugerah Industri Muzik | Best Album |
| Anugerah Industri Muzik | Best Pop Ethnic Album |
| Anugerah Industri Muzik | Best Female Vocal Performance in a Song ("Di Taman Teman") |
