= Sanggar Mustika =

2002 studio album by Siti Nurhaliza

Studio album by Siti Nurhaliza
- Released: 10 March 2002
- Recorded: January 2001 – February 2002
- Genre: Folk/Traditional
- Length: 49:42
- Label: Suria Records
- Producers: Pak Ngah, S. Atan, Ramli M.S

Siti Nurhaliza chronology
Safa (2001)	Sanggar Mustika (2002)	E.M.A.S. (2003)

Sanggar Mustika is the eighth studio album from Malaysian pop singer Siti Nurhaliza released in 2002.

Sanggar Mustika also pay tribute to the late Tan P. Ramlee with his song "Bunga Melor" and Toh Puan Rafeah Buang "Bisikan Hati". This song has been recorded by Siti Nurhaliza dedicated especially for her beloved mother, Siti Salmah Bachik. Among the most popular and well accepted song in the album are "Badarsila", "Nirmala" and "Kurik Kundi". Both "Nirmala" and "Kurik Kundi" were composed by the same composer (Pak Ngah). With his magical touch in traditional songs he made those two songs became popular and accepted by listeners with the touch of catchy beats blended with Samrah.

== Production ==
Sanggar Mustika became Siti Nurhaliza's fourth traditional album after the success of her previous traditional album – Cindai (1997), Seri Balas (with Noraniza Idris; 1999) and Sahmura (2000). It also was her fourth collaboration with Pak Ngah.

The album title was chosen based on the meaning "sanggar" which means place and "mustika" means beautiful or perfect. It was translated as the beautiful places to putting the traditional rhythms. The recording of Sanggar Mustika took place in January 2001 when Siti Nurhaliza launched her seventh album, Safa and completed in February 2002. Most of the lyrics in this album revolves around the question of discretion, moral, divine, avoid slander and many more.

One of the songs in the album, "Kurik Kundi" composed by Pak Ngah and written by Nurul Asyiqin requires Siti to use seven Malaysian state accents – namely Penangite, Kedahan, Perakian, Negeri Sembilan, Kelantanese, Sabahan and Sarawakian accents. In an interview with Utusan Malaysia on 15 March 2002, she said she willing to learn several district accents from several states in Malaysia to be included in "Kurik Kundi". Through this song, Siti wants to tell communities there that Malaysia is rich with various cultures, while saying: "I found this just very difficult while singing it in Kelantanese dialect, other languages such as Sabah and Sarawak was not a problem". (Note: Original: "Siti cuma menghadapi sedikit masalah sewaktu menyanyi lagu dalam loghat Kelantan. Bahasa lain seperti Sabah dan Sarawak, tidak ada masalah,")

Siti also said she is willing to work hard to ensure that the traditional rhythm successfully placed on a higher level, while satisfying with musical arrangements made by Ramli MS who also provides the modern rhythm. In Sanggar Mustika, she wrote the lyrics for "Panas Berteduh Gelap Bersuluh".

== Musical style ==
Sanggar Mustika is accompanied by ethnic fusion with the host of Malaysian artists. According to Siti, she choose to sing desert, joget, kroncong, inang, canggung music and other songs that reworked.

== Release and reception ==
Sanggar Mustika was released on 10 March 2002 and was well received. The album launch took place at the One Utama Shopping Centre in Damansara Utama, Petaling Jaya and inaugurated by Malaysian cultural figure Azah Aziz and attended by at least 2,000 fans.

Suria Records choose 10 March 2002 to launch this album to give a chance for Siti's fans to see the album launch. Jaya Jusco 1 Utama became the location for the album launch due to SRC and Siti's relationship with the management of Jaya Jusco 1 Utama while giving an open chance to anyone who came the album launch. Apart from that, Siti was chosen as the Jaya Jusco spokesperson who signed a deal officially on 7 March.

Three songs from Sanggar Mustika – "Nirmala", "Badarsila" and "Kurik Kundi" was released as the main singles and later made into music videos. The album sold over 40, 000 copies in Malaysia and 75, 000 copies in Indonesia and being certified gold by Asosiasi Industri Rekaman Indonesia (ASIRI). The album was released in Indonesia in April 2002.

== Critical response ==
Sanggar Mustika received mostly mixed reviews from music critics. Both Zainal Alam Kadir of New Straits Times and Jad Mahidin of The Sunday Mail gave the album two and half stars. Both critics were unimpressed with the songs included in the album. Zainal reviewed them as "mediocre" and Jad commented as "not one song that is outstanding". The same sentiment was echoed in reviews by Abie Abdullah of Harian Metro and Ellyna Ali of Berita Minggu. Most reviewers however have no qualms with Siti's vocals in the album. Zainal commended her vocals as one of the things listeners can look forward too and Abie noted that her vocal performance is one of her best. In a positive review by Meor Shariman of The Malay Mail, he praised the uniqueness and the music production of each song and he reviewed the album as one of Siti's best efforts.

== Track listing ==
No.	Title	Lyrics	Music	Length
1.	"Nirmala"	Che'Kem	Pak Ngah	5:36
2.	"Joget Senyum Memikat"	Nurul Asyiqin	S. Atan	4:28
3.	"Panas Berteduh Gelap Bersuluh"	Siti Nurhaliza	Khir Rahman	5:51
4.	"Bisikan Hati"	Haimon Abd. Rahman	Haimon Abd. Rahman	5:49
5.	"Badarsila"	Lokgha	Suflan Faidzal	4:11
6.	"Syair Kamelia"	Nurul Asyiqin	S. Atan	4:24
7.	"Di Batas Waktu"	Habsah Hassan	Naim	5:09
8.	"Sulam Sembilan"	Lokgha	Pak Ngah	5:40
9.	"Bunga Melor"	S. Sudarmaji	P. Ramlee	4:09
10.	"Kurik Kundi"	Nurul Asyiqin	Pak Ngah	3:49

== Awards ==
Awards	Category
Anugerah Juara Lagu Ke-17	Best Performance ("Nirmala")
Anugerah Juara Lagu Ke-17	Ethnic Pop Song Champion ("Nirmala")
Anugerah Industri Muzik	Best Female Vocal Performance in an Album (Sanggar Mustika)
Anugerah ERA	Best Choice Ethnic Song ("Badarsila") 2003
Anugerah ERA	Best Choice Ethnic Song ("Nirmala") 2002
Anugerah ERA	Best Choice Music Video ("Nirmala") 2002

== Trivia ==
- Siti sang Nirmala (Track number 1) during her solo concert on 1 April 2005 in Royal Albert Hall London for the Irama Malaysia segment where the audience applauded her high notes and the spectacular collaboration of graceful traditional dance and musical performance.
- Siti also won and notably awarded as The Best Vocal of Asia, during the Voice of Asia 2002 Grand Prix Champion where Siti sang Nirmala.
