= Adnan Abu Hassan (composer) =

Malaysian composer and musician (1959–2016)

Yang Berbahagia Datuk Adnan Abu Hassan DSDK
- Adnan in 2010
- Born: Adnan bin Abu Hassan; 6 January 1959; Alor Setar, Kedah, Federation of Malaya (now Malaysia)
- Died: 18 March 2016 (aged 57); Hospital Selayang, Selayang, Selangor, Malaysia
- Resting place: Kampung Sungai Ramal, Muslim Cemetery Kajang, Selangor
- Education: Berklee College of Music
- Occupations: Composer; music producer; recording producer; musician; lyricist
- Years active: 1980–2016
- Spouses: Dg. Sitti Aminah Datu Bachtiyal (m. 1994-2009), Rozinor Hafiza Mohd Fauzi (m. 2008-2016)
- Children: Aiman Zamir Adnan, Aina Zamira Adnan, Adrian Zahir Adnan
- Musical career
- Genres: Pop; R&B; Soul; Jazz; Ballad
- Instruments: Vocals; guitar; piano
- Labels: WEA Records; Suria Records; BMG Music

Datuk Adnan bin Abu Hassan (6 January 1959 – 18 March 2016) was a Malaysian composer and musician. He is considered to be among the top notch individuals developing the Malaysian music industry.

== Education ==
He held a bachelor's degree from the Berklee College of Music in Boston, Massachusetts, USA. He started his career as a lecturer in the Universiti Teknologi Mara.

== Career ==
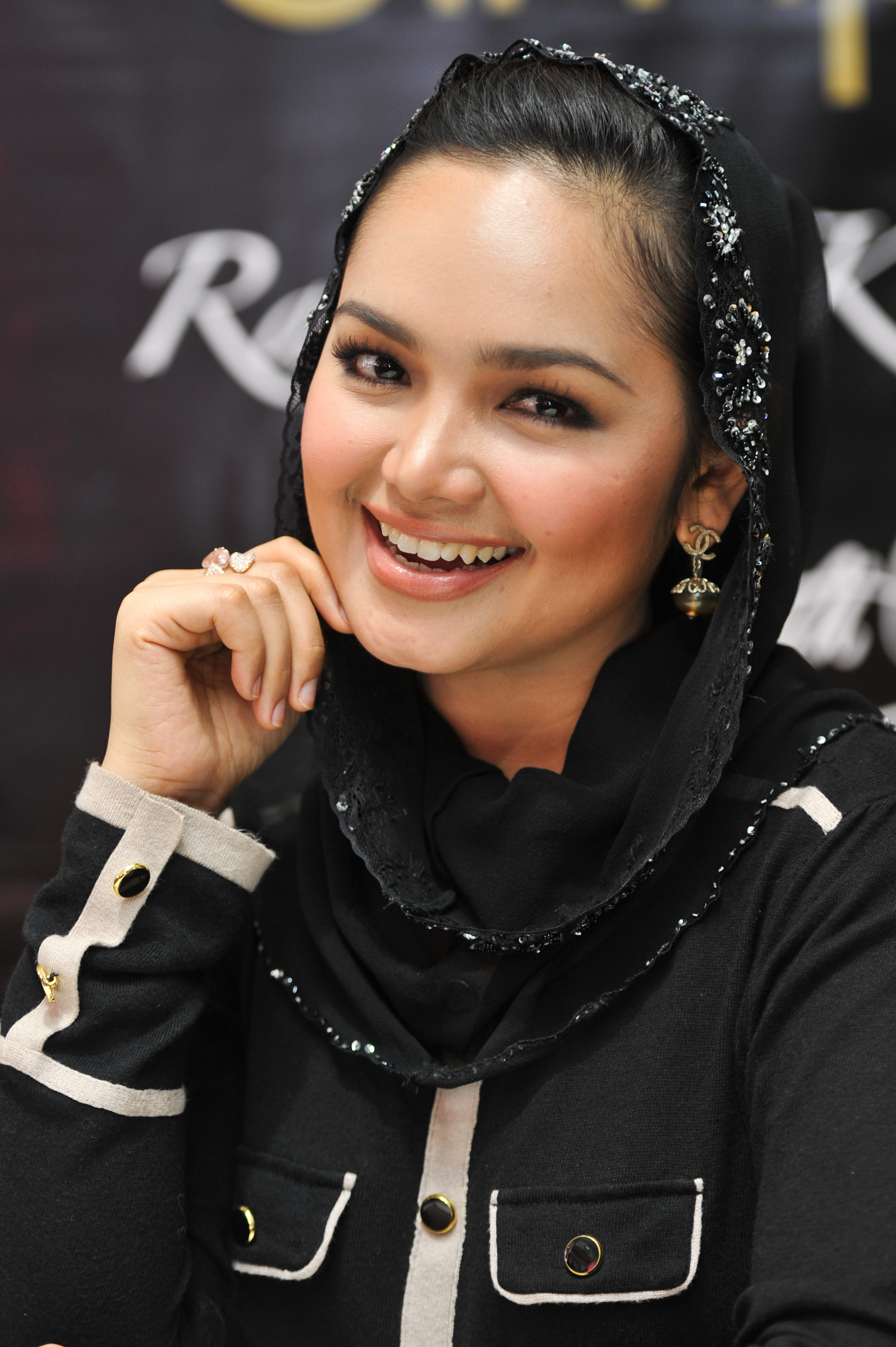
Siti Nurhaliza was one of Adnan's proteges.

Soon after the graduation, he became the A&R Director for CBS Records, Managing Director of Happy Records and Suria Records. Soon he became the Director of A&R for both BMG Music and Delima Records.

He was appointed as the Principal and Director of Jam Music Centre, Album Producer and Composer, who is also the Creative Director for Jam/Treeman Corporation. Malaysian popular singers such as Siti Nurhaliza, Fauziah Latiff, Dayang Nurfaizah and Misha Omar were once his apprentices before their rise into popularity. He was the Managing Director of SRD Villa Record.

He was also known for his appearance in the Akademi Fantasia reality singing contest as the vocal coach for the first three seasons.

== Achievements ==
Adnan won the Best Song in the Anugerah Juara Lagu with the song Jerat Percintaan by Siti Nurhaliza, in 1996, and the song Bunga-bunga Cinta by Misha Omar in 2003.

== Death ==
Adnan Abu Hassan died on 18 March 2016 at the age of 57 in the Selayang Hospital after suffering from a stroke. His body was laid to rest at the Kampung Sungai Ramal Dalam Muslim Cemetery in Kajang, Selangor.

== Awards ==
- 1986: 6th Malaysia Film Festival – Best Music
- 1987: 7th Malaysia Film Festival – Best Music Arrangement

== Filmography ==
=== As composer ===
- 1984: Matinya Seorang Patriot
- 1986: Ali Setan
- 1989: Ujang
- 1989: Anak Sarawak
- 1990: Rentak Desa
- 1992: Interlud
- 1995: Sayang Salmah

=== As theme song performer ===
- 1989: Anak Sarawak
- 2007: Cinta Yang Satu
