= Dato' Siti Nurhaliza Unplugged 2015 =

- Concert by Siti Nurhaliza
- Location: Kuala Lumpur, Malaysia
- Venue: Panggung Sari, Istana Budaya
- Associated album: Siti Nurhaliza I, Siti Nurhaliza II, Adiwarna, Pancawarna, Prasasti Seni, Transkripsi, Hadiah Daripada Hati and Fragmen
- Date: 7 April 2015
- No. of shows: 1

Siti Nurhaliza concert chronology
- Dato' Siti Nurhaliza - Live in Singapore (2014); Dato' Siti Nurhaliza Unplugged 2015 (2015); Konsert Satu Suara, Vol. 2 (2015)

Dato' Siti Nurhaliza Unplugged 2015 was a concert by Malaysian recording artist, Siti Nurhaliza. It was held on 7 April 2015 at Istana Budaya and marked her twentieth year in the Malaysian music industry. Almost all the songs performed during this one-night concert were from her own repertoire, covering her hits and popular songs from the beginning of her career to more recent ones.

Throughout the two-hour show, Siti performed almost thirty songs and more than twenty were composed and arranged into ten medleys. The concert also served as a platform for Siti to perform every song from her 2014 album, Fragmen. The concert was a commercial success; despite the fact that the concert was realised in less than two weeks, tickets to the concert sold out days prior to the concert night. The concert also received positive feedback and critical acclaim by critics who praised Siti's vocal performance even after being in the industry for more than twenty years.

== Background and development ==
"The organizing process of Konsert Unplugged this time around was done in a really short time frame. April is a special month for me, and it would not feel complete if I do not do something special this month. So I met Datuk Johari (Director of Istana Budaya) and asked [him] if there is any open slot. Even if it is for one day. Alhamdulillah (Praise be to Allah), there is one day (with no programs) and within that very two weeks is the time that I took for the preparation."

— Siti Nurhaliza in Dato' Siti Nurhaliza Unplugged 2015 (Note: Original:"Penganjuran Konsert Unplugged kali ini merupakan satu keputusan yang dibuat dalam masa yang begitu singkat. Bulan April merupakan bulan yang istimewa bagi Siti dan tak lengkap rasanya kalau Siti tak buat persembahan istimewa pada bulan ini. Jadi Siti jumpa Datuk Johari (Pengarah Istana Budaya) dan tanya jika ada slot yang kosong. Satu hari pun jadilah. Alhamdulillah, ada satu hari kosong dan dalam masa dua minggu itulah Siti buat persiapan.")

The realisation and execution of the show took around two weeks. The first advertisement for the show happened on 20 March when Siti's personal assistant revealed on her Facebook account that the special concert would be held on 7 April to mark Siti's twenty years in the music industry. Few snippets of Siti training for the show were also shared by Siti on her personal Instagram account. Siti openly admitted that these were fans who were angry and voiced out their dissatisfaction and sadness because they were unable to attend the concert due to the limited number of days, but it cannot be avoided since the concert was created in a short amount of time. Although the concert was planned and organised in about two weeks, all the tickets for the concert sold out days before the show.

Most of the songs performed at the concert were taken from Siti's pop albums, with other songs added to give the show some variations. However, more focus were given to the songs that are included in Fragmen, one of her most recent pop albums to date.

Being an unplugged concert, the vocal side of the performance was given more preparation since the whole set list was performed acoustically. Throughout the set list, only six musicians and four dancers were employed to accompany her, with Aubrey Suwito in charged of composing and arranging the music for the concert. Siti was accompanied by Awi Rafael, Datuk Adnan Abu Hassan and Faizal Tahir for parts of the concert where the songs that were composed and written by them.

== Performances ==
=== Fashion and stage ===
Keeping up with its minimal concert setting, Siti only changed her wardrobe twice. Both of her outfits were designed by Rizman Ruzaini.

=== Concert synopsis ===
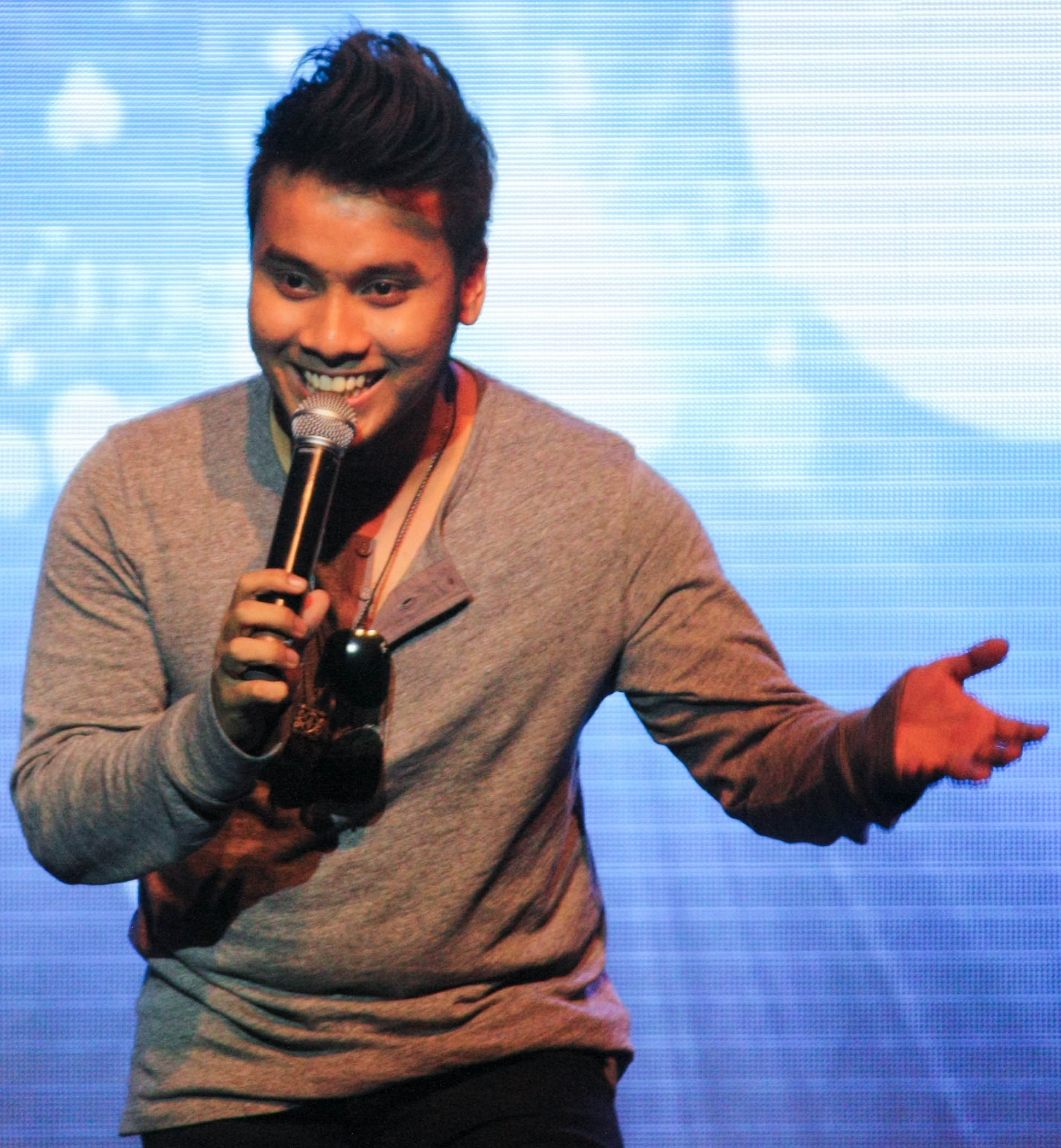
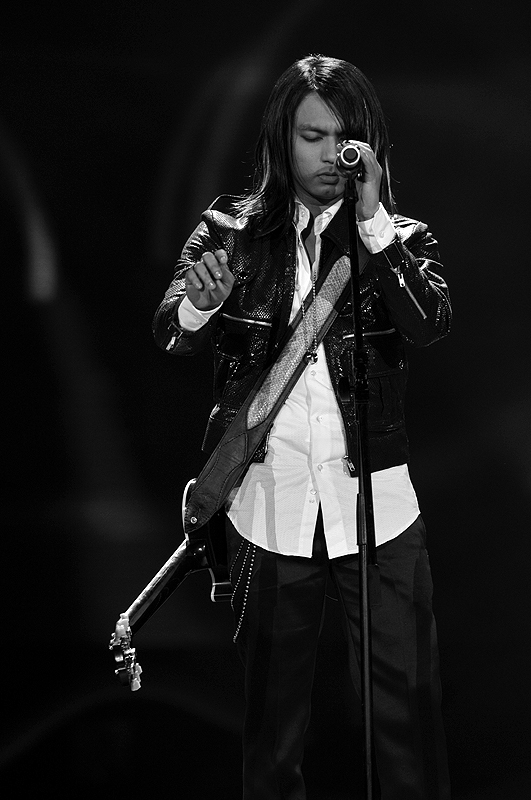
Awi Rafael (left) and Faizal Tahir (right) were invited to accompany Siti when she was singing the songs that they composed for Fragmen.

The concert began at 8.40 p.m. with Siti performing "Membunuh Benci" while accompanied by Aubrey Suwito on piano, who was the musical director for the concert. This was followed by the first medley of the night, composed of the first two upbeat songs of the night, "Mahligai Asmara" and "Satu Cinta Dua Jiwa" where she started to dance while singing. Between the performances, she shared some of her past experiences including when she first started singing professionally after winning 1995 Bintang Hiburan Minggu Ini (Bintang HMI) at the age of 16. She revealed that "Jawapan di Persimpangan", the first track from her debut album was the first song she recorded when she was under the tutelage of Datuk Adnan Abu Hassan. She resumed her performance by performing the second medley of the night composed of "Jawapan di Persimpangan", "Purnama Merindu" and "Diari Hatimu" and followed by another medley composed of "Aku Cinta Padamu" and "Biarlah Rahsia". For the next performance she invited Awi Rafael, the composer of "Mula dan Akhir," to accompany her on guitar while she sang the tune that he composed for her most recent album, Fragmen.

Siti returned to upbeat songs in a medley of "Intrig Cinta" and "Tanpa Kalian". Prior to the performance of these two songs, she invited a fan from Singapore to join her on the stage. She went performed another medley of her ballads, "Usah Diragui", "Wajah Kekasih" and "Kau Kekasihku". Present in the audience was also invited guests Tun Dr. Mahathir Mohamad, former Prime Minister of Malaysia with his wife, Tun Dr. Siti Hasmah Mohamad Ali. Siti reminisced the moment when she was taken from Subang airport after arriving from Shanghai straight to Langkawi by a helicopter to perform for an event that was attended by Tun Dr. Mahathir Mohamad. She was excited she was to meet Tun Dr. Mahathir Mohamad (who was still a prime minister at the time) and break the news personally to him that she just won the Gold Award from the Asia New Singer Competition in Shanghai in 1999.^{[note 1]}

In the second half of the concert, Siti invited Faizal Tahir to accompany her on guitar while she sang "Aku" and "Warna Dunia", the former of which was composed by Faizal for Fragmen. Later she also invited Datuk Adnan Abu Hassan to accompany her on piano to the songs that were written and composed by him, "Jerat Percintaan" and "Gelora Asmara". During the performance she recalled when Adnan helped her when was beginning her career as a singer. She told the audience, "Abang D (Adnan) is among the individuals that is responsible of taking me into this industry, I actually once stayed at his house back when I was becoming an artist. At the time, he just got married and he is yet to have any children, so I took shelter in an empty room inside his house." (Note: Original:"Abang D antara individu yang bertanggungjawab membawa saya dalam industri ini, saya pernah menumpang di rumahnya ketika baru-baru jadi artis dulu. Ketika itu dia baru sahaja berkahwin dan belum mempunyai anak, jadi saya tumpang sebuah bilik kosong di rumahnya.") She resumed her performance with another three medleys. The first one is a medley of cover songs, "Epilog Cinta dari Bromley" by Sohaimi Mior Hassan and "Suratan Atau Kebetulan" by Kenny, Remy and Martin, followed by a medley of her songs again which was a medley of "Engkau Bagaikan Permata" and "Cahaya Seribu Liku". The final medley was three songs from Fragmen written by Indonesian songwriters and composers — "Sanubari", "Terbaik Bagimu" and "Kau Sangat Bererti". She finished the show by performing all the songs from Fragmen that were released as singles including "Jaga Dia Untukku", "Lebih Indah" and "Seluruh Cinta". Originally a duet, this concert marked the first solo performance of "Seluruh Cinta".

== Critical response ==
"Everything is phenomenal and the best. "Konsert Unplugged Datuk Siti Nurhaliza" last Tuesday night at Istana Budaya is not just a typical concert to be watched. But it transcends more than the common threshold and barriers. It is the concert that completes the career journey of 20 years for an artist that possesses extraordinary talent in this country. This concert goes to prove the impression how Siti's influence is no longer unstoppable when Panggung Sari (of Istana Budaya) was packed due to Siti's appearance on the stage for only one single night."

— Arif Nizam Abdullah, Malaysia Gazette (Note: Original:"Semuanya hebat dan terbaik. Konsert Unplugged Datuk Siti Nurhaliza pada malam Selasa lalu di Istana Budaya bukanlah hanya sebuah konsert yang biasa untuk ditonton. Tetapi ia melangkau daripada batas dan sempadan kebiasaan itu.Ia sebuah konsert yang telah melengkapkan perjalanan karier selama 20 tahun bagi seorang anak seni yang memiliki bakat luar biasa di negara ini. Konsert tersebut juga mengesahkan tanggapan betapa pengaruh Siti tidak mungkin dibendung lagi apabila Panggung Sari penuh sesak gara-gara kemunculan Siti di atas pentas hanya satu malam.")

Despite the short planning and execution time for the concert, it received positive responses from music critics. Most reviewers agreed that despite the simplistic nature of the acoustic concert, her vocals was the best part of the concert. Izzat Mohd Anuar from MyNewsHub commented on this fact as "Opting to appear simplistic in term of her dresses and stage decorations, Siti does not compromise from her vocals side where she is still able to show her 'fangs' (vocals) that are still potent and unchanged." (Note: Original:"Memilih untuk tampil serba ringkas dari segi busana dan tata rias pentas, Siti, walau bagaimanapun tidak berkompromi dari sisi vokalnya apabila beliau berupaya memperlihatkan ‘taringnya’ yang masih berbisa dan kekal sama.") One reviewer from Kosmo! also shared the same sentiment. The reviewer commented, "For this concert, in accordance to its acoustic theme, Siti does not go over the top. [...] But, the most important fact that the audience should know is how she spellbinds the audience for more than two hours just by listening to her singing her selection of hits that are well-kept in her art (music) portfolio." (Note: Original:"Pada konsert kali ini, sesuai dengan tema akustik, Siti tidak tampil berlebihan. [...] Namun, fakta penting yang khalayak perlu tahu ialah bagaimana beliau membius para penonton selama dua jam lebih hanya untuk mendengarnya mengalunkan seleksi lagu hit yang berada kemas dalam portfolio seninya.")

Siti's vocals referred as "merdu" (sweet) by Syanty Octavia Amry of Harian Metro, Dhiya Aizat of Tonton Extra, Nurfarhana Mohamed of Utusan Online and Shazryn Mohd. Faizal of The Rakyat Post. Nina Farzuin Md Sharom of Sinar Harian praised Siti's vocal performance even after more than twenty years being in the industry. She wrote, "Even after twenty years have passed, but the sweetness of this singer's voice is still able to make all the audience captivated.", (Note: Original:"Biarpun dua puluh tahun telah berlalu, namun kelunakan suara penyanyi ini masih lagi mampu membuat seluruh penonton yang hadir terpesona.") an opinion which is also shared by Shazryn of The Rakyat Post. Che'AZ, reviewer from the English version of The Rakyat Post commented, "Siti not only drowned her audience with her powerful vocals, she also proved to them that she is truly in a league of her own by mesmerising the entire crowd with her melodious arrangements."

A number of reviewers also agree that one of the most poignant moments of the concert was when Siti invited her former mentor, Datuk Adnan Abu Hassan to the stage to accompany her on piano while she is belting songs of his creation - "Jerat Percintaan" and "Gelora Asmara". Shazryn Mohd. Faizal of The Rakyat Post called the moment of the performance as "peak of the concert" and "heart-touching", while reviewer from Murai called it as "heart-wrenching". The reviewer further commented, "Even though Datuk Adnan's health condition is still unstable and it was said he's having a stroke, his spirit to be with Siti Nurhaliza is strong although he had to be helped to get on the stage. That slot managed to make the audience in the hall to feel wistful and melancholic, but with Adnan's fingers playing the piano is proving that he is still able to perform and further beautify "Konsert Unplugged Siti Nurhaliza"." (Note: Original:"Walaupun kondisi kesihatan Datuk Adnan belum lagi stabil yang dikhabarkan penghidap penyakit stroke, semangatnya untuk bersama-sama Siti Nurhaliza amat kuat walaupun dipimpin untuk naik ke pentas. Slot itu berjaya membuatkan penonton di dewan terasa sebak dan hiba, namun jari-jemari Adnan memetik piano membuktikan dirinya masih lagi mampu membuat persembahan dan mengindahkan lagi Konsert Unplugged Siti Nurhaliza.")

Critics have noted that Siti has become more comfortable with her communication and interaction skills when she is on the stage, a fact which Siti addressed during the concert. She admitted that during her early years, she was afraid to speak with the media. Rosli Manah of Mangga Online whom Siti personally thanked for being the first journalist to interview her during her early years also noted the same fact. Rosli commented, "I did not expect that I was the first journalist to interview Siti at that time. I'm not asking to be remembered, but Siti is a person who remembers others' deeds and [is] down-to-earth. The utmost important is that she is a person who always tries to improve herself. For me, this is what has brought [her] to her success." (Note: Original:"Saya pun tak sangka rupa-rupanya sayalah wartawan pertama yang menemubual Siti pada masa itu. Bukan minta dikenang, tapi sememangnya Siti seorang yang mengenang budi dan merendah diri. Paling utama dia seorang yang sentiasa mahu membaiki diri. Pada saya ia salah satu amalan yang membawa kepada kejayaannya.")

Most reviewers and critics agreed that the one-day concert was a success. Reviewer from Kosmo! concluded the review with, "Ah, Datuk [sic: Dato'] Siti Nurhaliza. No matter how hard we try to undermine or disprove Siti's abilities, with that much hardness this 36 year old woman will continue to prove that she is indeed the best star of the stage for us all." (Note: Original:"Ah, Datuk Siti Nurhaliza. Sekuat mana pun kita untuk merendah atau menidakkan keampuhan Siti, sekuat itu juga wanita berusia 36 tahun ini akan terus membuktikan bahawa beliau memang seri panggung terbaik bagi kita semua.")

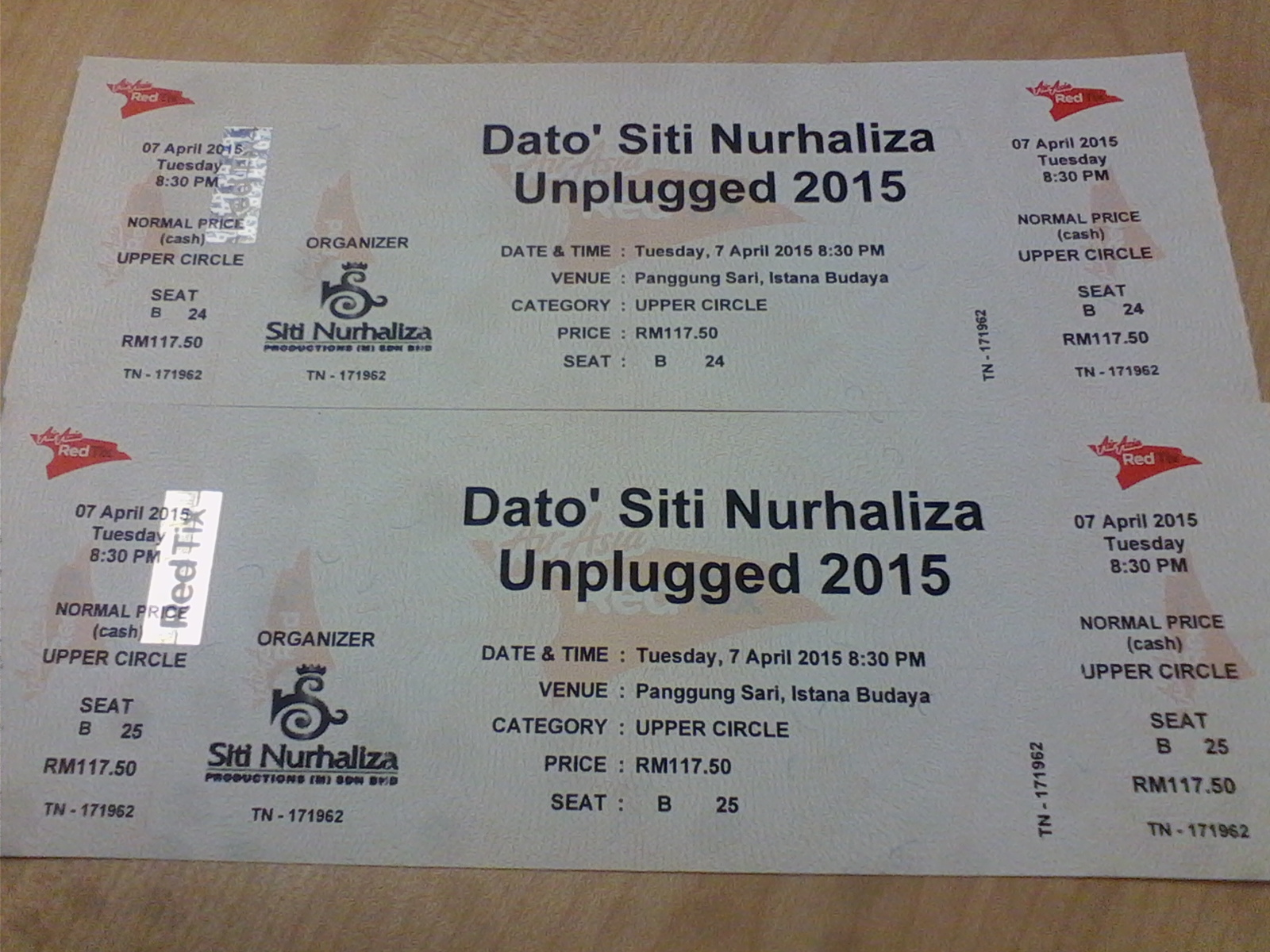
A pair of tickets for the concert which was held at Istana Budaya

== Commercial performance ==
Tickets for the concert were made available for online purchase though the concert's official online vendor, AirAsiaRedTix.com. The tickets were also sold on selected outlets for manual pick-ups. Although the concert was planned and executed in two weeks, tickets that were priced from RM 78 to RM 518 and sold in late March. They were sold out at least three days before the day of the concert.

== Set list ==
1. "Membunuh Benci"
2. First Medley
  1. "Mahligai Asmara"
  2. "Satu Cinta Dua Jiwa"
3. Second Medley
  1. "Jawapan di Persimpangan"
  2. "Purnama Merindu"
  3. "Diari Hatimu"
4. Third Medley
  1. "Aku Cinta Padamu"
  2. "Biarlah Rahsia"
5. "Mula dan Akhir"
6. Fourth Medley
  1. "Intrig Cinta"
  2. "Tanpa Kalian"
7. Fifth Medley
  1. "Usah Diragui"
  2. "Wajah Kekasih"
  3. "Kau Kekasihku"
8. Sixth Medley
  1. "Aku"
  2. "Warna Dunia"
9. Seventh Medley
  1. "Jerat Percintaan"
  2. "Gelora Asmara"
10. Eighth Medley
  1. "Epilog Cinta dari Bromley"
  2. "Suratan Atau Kebetulan"
11. Ninth Medley
  1. "Engkau Bagaikan Permata"
  2. "Cahaya Seribu Liku"
12. Tenth Medley
  1. "Sanubari"
  2. "Terbaik Bagimu"
  3. "Kau Sangat Bererti"
13. "Jaga Dia Untukku"
14. "Lebih Indah"
15. "Seluruh Cinta" (Encore)

Source — ^{[note 2]}

== Personnel ==
Credits adapted from Unplugged booklet liner notes.

=== Main concert ===
- Adzwa - dance instructor
- Alud @ Khairul Azmir Abdul Hamid - concert manager, concert administrator
- Aniza - dancer
- Aubrey Suwito - musical director, post production, arrangement, piano
- Awi Rafael - guest artist
- Chandelier Trust Lighting Collection - sponsor
- Dato' Adnan Abu Hassan - guest artist
- Dato' Mohamed Juhari Shaarani - adviser
- Dato' Siti Nurhaliza - executive producer, vocals
- Derrick Siow - drums
- Fadzliana - dancer
- Faizal Tahir - guest artist
- Fara Wahida - dancer
- Firdaus Dalip - monitor engineer
- 'Fly' Halizor Hussein - electric bass, upright bass
- Joel Voo - acoustic guitar
- Juanita - background vocals
- Lentera Creative Home - sponsor
- Lim Jae Sern - violin
- Marina - dancer
- Miela @ Norfazilah Abu Seman - management/production
- Mohd Azli Othman - compere
- Mohd Rafi Shafie - acoustic guitar
- Moke Printing - sponsor
- Nur Iman @ Aiman - production manager
- Nurul Shuhada - dancer
- Nurul Shukor - make-up artist
- Ozlan Othman - lighting director
- Paradigm Studio - photography
- Rizman Ruzaini - wardrobe designer, sponsor
- Rozi Abdul Razak - idea, concept, script, coordinator
- Shaun Paiva - assistant sound engineer/recording,
- Siti Norsaida Tarudin - management/production
- Steve Thornton - percussion
- Sunil Kumar - sound engineer/recording, mixing
- Syaiful Rasyidi @ Ad - technical director
- Widy - background vocals
- Zaramiz Sdn. Bhd. - sponsor

=== Istana Budaya workforce ===
Production

- Mohd Azli Othman - production
- Mohd Ferdaus Hassan - production
- Rozita Ismail - production
- Suhaimi Abdul Rahim - production

Management

- Azhar Mohamad - management
- Harttzery Nazry Hatta - management
- Kamarulanuar Ismail - management
- M Ramlee Hj Ismail - management
- Mohd Ridhuan Wan Mohd Zin - management
- Mohd Yusoff Bokhri - management

Audiovisual unit

- Hakimi Mohd Zain - audiovisual unit
- Jafri Hasan - audiovisual unit
- Mohamad Yusri Zain - audiovisual unit
- Mohd Zunohan Md Noor - audiovisual unit
- Mohd Zul'amri Amran - audiovisual unit
- Muhamad Fadzli Ramli - audiovisual unit

Stage management

- Anuar Mohamad Kassim - stage management
- Azrulnizam Aziz - stage management
- Barat Anak Echan - stage management
- Mohd Anuar Zakaria - stage management
- Mohd Sujak Othman - stage management
- Mohd Sufri Mohamad - stage management
- Sha'ari Hashin - stage management
- Yuzaidi Md Yusuf - stage management

Art and design

- Abdul Razak Abdol Rahim - art and design
- Mohd Azali Idris - art and design
- Mohd Khairul Adnan Khalid - art and design
- Rudy Efendy Jammakhir - art and design
- Sazali Ismail - art and design

Technical

- Ahmad Ruzaini Bin Mohd Sharif
- Ahmad Tarmizi Muhammad
- Amir Bin Abu
- Amir Husni Bin Hamidun
- Azhari Bin Abdul Rashid
- Azli Bin Baharuddin
- Azri Bin Seman
- Azzazial Bin Shuib
- Fareez Bin Sadikon
- Ilmi Bin Cek Hamid
- Ismail B. Mohammad
- Khairul Aizat Bin Alias
- Khairul Anuar Bin Jaafar
- Maharini Binti Bidin
- Mat Nuri Bin Mat Ali
- Mohammad Fairolnizam Bin Ali Othman
- Mohammad Faizal Bin Hj. Hamid
- Mohammed Herman Bin Majid
- Mohd Alizar Bin Sulaiman
- Mohd Fyrulnizam Bin Mohd Yusof
- Mohd Halimi Bin Hassan
- Mohd Nizam Abu Bakar
- Mohd Nizam B. Bakar
- Mohd Rizal Bin Johari @ Razak
- Mohd Yusoff Bin Kassim
- Muhammad Zaki Bin Abu Samah
- Nik Mohd Fadzir Bin Nik Ismail
- Osmar Bin Fariez
- Salleh Bin Muhammad
- Suzahani Bin Shuib
- Tines Kumar A/L Murugasu
- Wan Ayubee B. Wan Razoly
- Wan Mohd Azam Bin Wan Ishak
- Wan Zahari Bin Wan Ismail
- Zulkeflee Bin Husin

Front of House

- Abdul Malik Bin Osman
- Ahmad Jamri Bin Jamaluddin
- Aniza Bt. Baharom
- Azman Bin Abu Bakar
- Azrita Aida Bt. Abdul Aziz
- Boniface Anak Babai
- Fauziah Hanim Bt. Mohd. Zain
- Halimattun Bt. Mohd Nor
- Hamdan Bin Awang
- Hanipah Bt. Hairi
- Hasnul Bin Hassan
- Jailani Bin Abdul Razak
- Marina Mary Charles
- Md Firdaus Bin Alias
- Mohamad Nizam Bin Elias
- Mohd Aizat Bin Rusly
- Norhashimah Bt. Leman
- Nor Haslinda Bt. Abdul Manaf
- Nor Zulzaliana Bt. Yahya
- Nurul Wahida Bt. Zulkifli
- Roslinah Bt. Haroun
- Roszilawati Bt. Abd Rahim
- Rudy De Luna Jr
- Saniah Bt. Aziz
- Siti Norhabsah Bt. Syeikh Ahmad
- Siti Sarah Bt. Abdul Kalam
- Syaira Dalina Bt. Abdullah
- Zamri Bin Mohamad

== Footnotes ==
- Note 1: Siti might have misnamed the name of the singing competition and later was misquoted by the media. Siti actually won the Gold Award from the Asia New Singer Competition and not the Golden Voice Singing Competition as reported by Kemalia Othman of mStar and several other news outlets.
- Note 2: When Adnan Abu Hassan accompanied Siti on stage, he played the piano for "Jerat Percintaan" and "Gelora Asmara" and not "Jerat Percintaan" and "Azimat Cinta".
