= Dato' Siti Nurhaliza & Friends Concert =

Dato' Siti Nurhaliza & Friends
- Concert by Siti Nurhaliza
- Location: Kuala Lumpur, Malaysia
- Venue: Stadium Negara
- Associated album: Siti Nurhaliza I, Siti Nurhaliza II, Cindai, Safa, E.M.A.S, Prasasti Seni, Transkripsi, Hadiah Daripada Hati, Fragmen and Unplugged.
- Date: April 2, 2016
- Supporting acts: Anggun, Afgansyah Reza, Cakra Khan, Faizal Tahir, Jaclyn Victor, Joe Flizzow, Hafiz Suip, and SonaOne
- Attendance: 7000

Siti Nurhaliza concert chronology
- Konsert Satu Suara, Vol. 2 (2015); Dato' Siti Nurhaliza & Friends (2016); Dato' Sri Siti Nurhaliza On Tour (2019)

Yonder Music Live Series: Dato' Siti Nurhaliza & Friends Concert (also known as Dato' Siti Nurhaliza & Friends Concert or simply Dato' Siti Nurhaliza & Friends) was a single day concert by Malaysian recording artist, Siti Nurhaliza. Sponsored by Celcom and Yonder Music, the free concert was only available exclusively to Celcom users who are subscribers of the Yonder Music mobile app. It was held on 2 April 2016 and she was supported and accompanied by five Malaysian artists and three Indonesian artists. Staged at Stadium Negara, the supporting acts during the night of the concert were Faizal Tahir, Hafiz Suip, Jaclyn Victor, Joe Flizzow, and SonaOne of Malaysia and Afgansyah Reza, Anggun, and Cakra Khan from Indonesia.^{[note 1]}

Most of the songs that were performed at the concert were taken from her own repertoire. The selected songs were performed either by Siti on her own or as a duet or as a group with the supporting artists. She also performed for the first time a "digital duet" with Whitney Houston for the song "Memories". The concert was a success with more than 7000 attendees came to watch the concert. It received positive feedback and reviews from concert reviewers and critics who praised Siti's vocals and overall showmanship.

Few days after the concert was staged, the concert's live album was available for exclusive streaming on the Yonder Music mobile app.

== Background, development, and promotion ==
"Dato' Siti Nurhaliza & Friends is both an expression of our gratitude and utmost respect for Dato' Siti's contribution to the Malaysian music industry as one of the nation's leading artist over the past two decades. The event itself marks the beginning of a second chapter, with an extraordinary band from New York City, full orchestra and a constellation of guest stars. It's going to be the brightest of nights."

— Adam Kidron, CEO of Yonder Music during Dato' Siti Nurhaliza & Friends's first press conference.

The news of the concert was first announced by Siti on 20 January 2016 during her 37th birthday celebration. She originally decided to take a break from performing for major concerts in 2016. However, she decided to postpone her rest after she was approached by Yonder Music with the idea and the offer of organizing a special concert for her. She also revealed that this concert will be her last before an extended hiatus until July 2016 so that she can focus on her personal life after experiencing a miscarriage in 2015. In the original plan, the concert was supposed to take place at the Plenary Hall of Kuala Lumpur Convention Center (KLCC) on 5 and 6 March 2016. However, after a follow-up meeting with the main organizers of the concert, the concert was later rescheduled to 2 April 2016. The final date for the concert was also chosen to coincide with the celebration of her 20th year involvement in the music industry.

On 2 March 2016, during the concert's first press conference, more details about the concert were revealed. Unlike the original plan, the concert will only be held on a single day, 2 April 2016. It will be also staged at Stadium Negara instead of KLCC. Billed as "Datuk Siti Nurhaliza & Friends", five supporting acts from Malaysia and Indonesia were also announced. Accompanied by Faizal Tahir and Hafiz Suip, two Malaysian singers who will be supporting her during the concert, the organizers also announced the involvement of three Indonesian singers who will be sharing the stage with Siti: Afgansyah Reza, Anggun, and Cakra Khan. Sponsored by Celcom and Yonder Music, tickets for the concert were not available for sale. The free concert was set to be only available exclusively for 6000 chosen Celcom users who are subscribers of the Yonder Music mobile app.

Siti Nurhaliza being interviewed about her Dato' Siti Nurhaliza & Friends Concert by Neelofa and Nabil Ahmad for MeleTOP.

On 23 March, a second press conference for the concert was held. After receiving an overwhelming response from the public, the seating arrangement for the concert was revised so that it can fit an additional 1000 people, making the final number is 7000 people. Yonder Music also decided to add two more guest Malaysian artists who will be Siti's supporting acts – Joe Flizzow and SonaOne.^{[note 1]} She also will be accompanied by The Gotham All-Stars band and a 47-piece orchestra throughout the concert.

Promotions for the concert were mostly done in late March. These were including an appearance by Siti on various electronic media. Some of the radio stations that she visited were Fly FM and Hot FM. She also made various appearances on a number of television programs including MeleTOP and hLive on a number of channels of Astro pay television services. She also appeared on TV3's morning television show, Malaysia Hari Ini for the promotion of the concert.

== Performances ==
=== Fashion and stage ===
Dato' Siti Nurhaliza & Friends Concert marked Siti Nurhaliza's first concert to be organized at Stadium Merdeka, an enclosed indoor arena. Her makeup for the night was provided by Nurul Shukor while her dresses were designed and created by Rizman Ruzaini. Rizman Nordin of the Rizman Ruzaini duo revealed that he was asked by Yonder Music to create "outstanding" dresses for Siti for the night. According to him, the original colour theme for Siti's dresses was red per the request by the organizer. However, he decided that gold should also be included in the dresses' palette to make Siti more outstanding.

The designs for all three dresses were entrusted by Siti to the duo. For the first dress, they used a red net cloth that comes with motifs sewn into it. For the second dress, inspired from the first time Siti worked with them, they used red lace and net to make the dress. For the final dress, which was a striped sequin gold dress with a red base and side panels, they used fabrics that are full of sequins to make it. Few adjustments were done to the designs after they saw her during the full rehearsals of the concert, including changing the colours of her tudungs. All three dresses were made from imported fabrics and materials. It took them three weeks to finish designing and creating all the dresses.

=== Synopsis ===
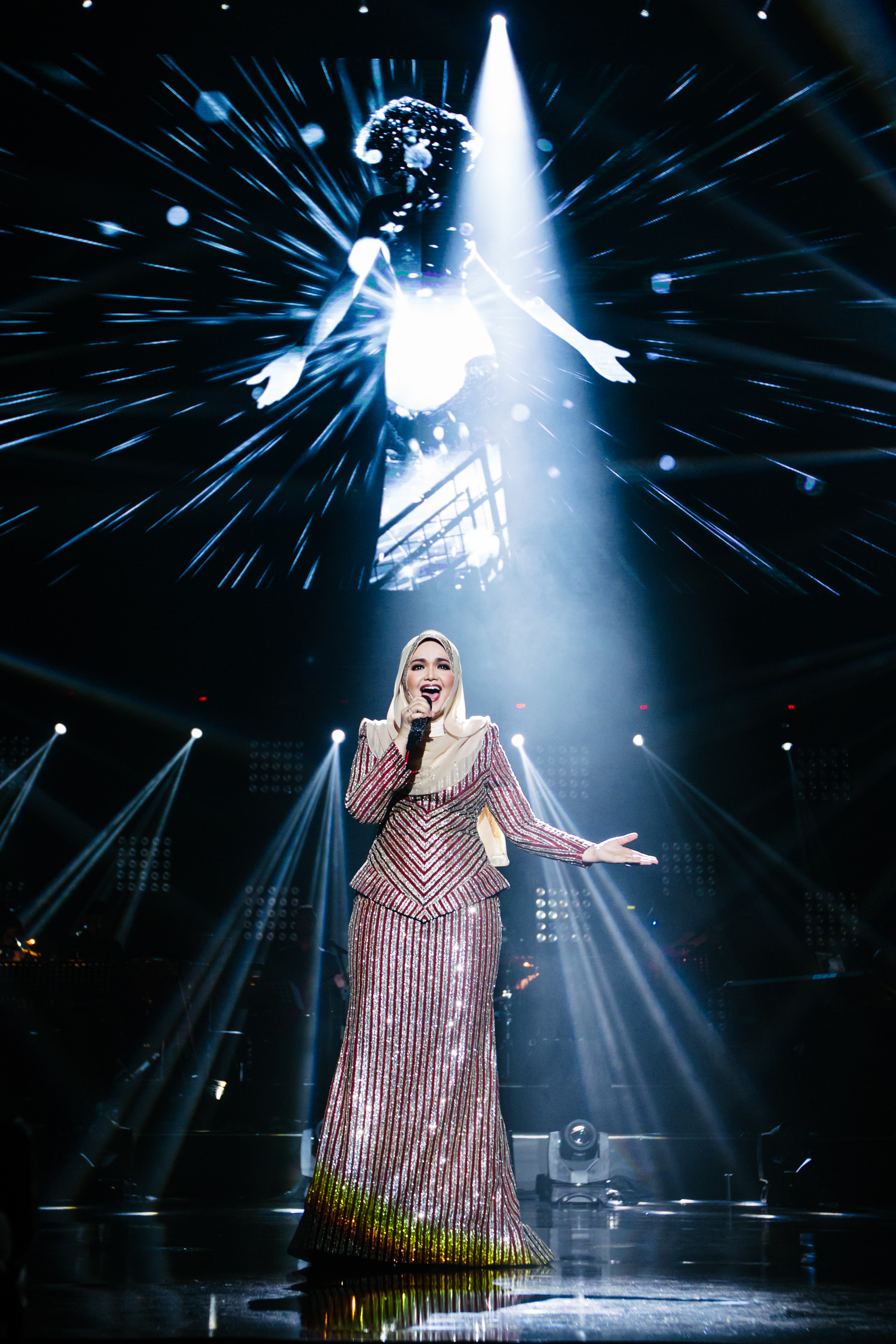
Siti Nurhaliza performing "Memories" for the first time at the Dato' Siti Nurhaliza & Friends Concert.

Dato' Siti Nurhaliza & Friends Concert has three main segments. The first segment saw her performing her songs as "unplugged" while the second and her last segment saw her being accompanied by a live band and a full orchestra respectively. The two-hour concert began close to 9 p.m. with an opening dance routine by a young girl which is said "to represent Siti as a young girl who dreamt of becoming an entertainer". Siti later appeared on the stage to begin the "unplugged" segment of her concert with the acoustic rendition of "Aku Cinta Padamu". She later performed "Percayalah", "Jaga Dia Untukku", and "Terbaik Bagimu".

In the next segment with live band, accompanied by Sonaone and Joe Flizzow, she performed a medley of her upbeat songs – "Ku Mahu", "Ku Milikmu", and "Destinasi Cinta". She later invited on stage Anggun to perform a duet with Anggun's own song, "Snow on the Sahara". They later sang together Siti's own song, "Bukan Cinta Biasa". She closed the live band segment with "Cindai", her traditional song that was reworked with a more modern music arrangement for the concert.

For the second half of the concert, she was accompanied by a full orchestra for the remaining songs of the set list. The orchestra segment began with the performance of "Memories", a previously unreleased song by Whitney Houston. Recorded by Whitney in 1982, the unreleased song was given to Siti by Yonder Music. For the concert, it was performed as a "digital duet" where Siti sang as a duet with prerecorded Whitney's vocals. She credited Whitney for teaching her about proper vocal techniques before singing few lines from "I Will Always Love You" a cappella. She later performed "Jerat Percintaan", her first single that was composed by Datuk Adnan Abu Hassan as a tribute to him after he died a few weeks before the concert on 18 March 2016. Next, she performed two of her duet songs with two male singers who have originally recorded the two songs with her respectively. She first sang with Hafiz Suip for "Muara Hati" before proceeding with another duet with Cakra Khan for "Seluruh Cinta". She then proceeded the show with the performance of "Menatap dalam Mimpi" and a medley of "Seindah Biasa" and "Kau Sangat Bererti". After the medley, she called on stage Faizal Tahir for the duet performance of "Bagaikan Sakti". After the duet, she briefly recalled the memories of her late father before tearing up since he was not there "to witness this momentous moment" with her. (Note: Original:"untuk menyaksikan detik bersejarah ini") After the brief recollection, she was joined by Afgansyah Reza for the performance of "Biarlah Rahsia" before closing the orchestra segment of the concert with solo performance of "Lebih Indah". After she exited the stage, she later was accompanied by all her guest artists including Jaclyn Victor to the stage for the encore performance of "Kau Ilhamku".

Throughout the concert, for every break and Siti's dress change, prerecorded video interviews with individuals who are closed with Siti were shown on the large screen at the back. Individuals who were interviewed were including her close family members, friends, colleagues, and even her former school teachers. At the end of the concert, music video for "Memories" was also shot and recorded for later release.

== Critical response ==
Vocal performances and overall showmanship of Siti and her duet partners were subjects of critics' appraisals. Although this concert marked Siti's first collaboration with Anggun, their duet performances were highly praised. Nadia Azam of Malaysiakini reviewed that Siti's duet with Anggun was "the most awaited performance of the night" (Note: Original:"Bahagian paling menarik pada persembahan malam tadi [...]") and Nor Amirah Mahmuddin of Youth Bernama called the pair as a "unique combination". (Note: Original:"gabungan unik") Izwan Mohd Isa of Kosmo! commented that their vocals for the two duets of "Snow on the Sahara" and "Bukan Cinta Biasa" were "utterly breathtaking". (Note: Original:"sangat memukau") Bissme S. of The Sun also shared the same sentiment. He commented, "Sometimes, when you have a duet with two skilled singers, things can go terribly wrong. They may try to upstage one other. Thankfully, that did not happen here. Anggun and Siti complemented each other perfectly. It was just two good friends having a good time on stage." He also favoured Siti's duet with another Indonesian singer, Afgansyah Reza for "Biarlah Rahsia". He commented, "The combination of his raspy voice and her powerful vocals provided a unique and interesting flavour for the evening." He also reviewed that Siti's duet with Faizal Tahir for "Bagaikan Sakti" was "memorable" and he "managed to put his own personality into the song." Siti's duets with Cakra Khan and Hafiz Suip for "Seluruh Cinta" and "Muara Hati" respectively were reviewed positively by Nor Amirah Mahmuddin of Youth Bernama who stated that Siti's vocals blended really well with her singing partners.

Siti's "digital duet" with Whitney Houston for the debut live performance of "Memories" was reviewed favourably by the critics. Siti Athirah Dzulkifly of Utusan Malaysia called the duet as "unique", Bissme S. of The Sun reviewed it as "one of the highlights of the night", and Jemang Rahman of mStar praised it as "Siti continues to spellbind thousands of her audience with her impressive vocals" (Note: Original:"Siti terus memukau ribuan penonton dengan vokal mantapnya [...]") and "will be remembered by the audience". (Note: Original:"amat terkesan diingatan penonton") Bissme S. of The Sun, however, reviewed negatively the opening act of the dancing young girl. He criticized the routine as "tame, lame and dull" and "I think the concept didn't work out as intended. Instead of enchanting everyone, this act made the crowd restless. We couldn't wait for the dancing to stop and the music to begin." He later added that Siti "saved the day" when she appeared on the stage and "from that point on, the concert was a roller coaster ride of pure entertainment."

Overall, Dato Siti Nurhaliza & Friends Concert received positive reviews and feedback from critics and concert reviewers. Haslina Kamaludin of Sinar Harian in her review stated, "IMPRESSIVE! That is what [one] can say after watching the Dato Siti Nurhaliza & Friends Concert. Overall, this concert deserves to be given five stars. From the aspect of its lighting, musicians, music arrangements, and her vocals, there are nothing left to be argued." (Note: Original:"MANTAP! Hanya itu yang boleh diungkapkan usai menonton Konsert Datuk Siti Nurhaliza & Friends. Secara keseluruhan, konsert ini layak diberikan lima bintang. Daripada segi pencahayaan, pemuzik, susunan muzik dan vokal penyanyi ini tidak ada yang perlu dipertikaikan lagi.") A number of reviewers also echoed Haslina's review that the event is a 5-star concert. Izwan Mohd Isa of Kosmo! in his review stated, "[...] In the 20 years that she has steered her career as a vocalist, this 37 years old woman has also never failed in placing herself among the best, until the point she was able to receive the "seal of approval" as the nation's number one singer by the public." (Note: Original:"[...] dalam tempoh 20 tahun menakhodakan karier sebagai pelantun suara, wanita berusia 37 tahun itu juga belum pernah gagal meletakkan dirinya antara yang terbaik, sehingga melayakkan beliau menerima 'cop mohor' sebagai penyanyi nombor satu negara daripada khalayak.") He concluded his review with:

From the music arrangements, sound [system], stage organization and lighting techniques, Yonder Music has successfully created a fresh environment to visualize Siti's 20 years in the industry. This concert henceforth has become a benchmark for Siti as a credible entertainer who deserves to fly high in the music stratosphere for more than 20 years. May she live long with her career [continues] to 'mature' and [becomes more] profound. (Note: Original:"Dari segi susunan muzik, bunyi, susun atur pentas dan teknik pencahayaan, pihak Yonder Music berjaya mewujudkan suasana segar bagi menggambarkan usia 20 tahun Siti bergelar anak seni. Konsert ini sekali gus menjadi penanda aras buat Siti sebagai penghibur berkredibiliti yang memang layak terbang tinggi di angkasa seni selama 20 tahun. Semoga Siti lanjut usia dengan karier yang lebih 'masak' dan hebat.")

== Broadcast and recording ==
For fans who could not attend the show, the concert was made available for streaming on ESCAPE by Celcom during the night of the concert. Few days after the event, a live album for the concert was made available for streaming on the Yonder Music mobile app for its subscribers.

The live concert also aired on Astro Ria (Channel 104/123) on December 11, 2016 at 9pm.

== Set list ==
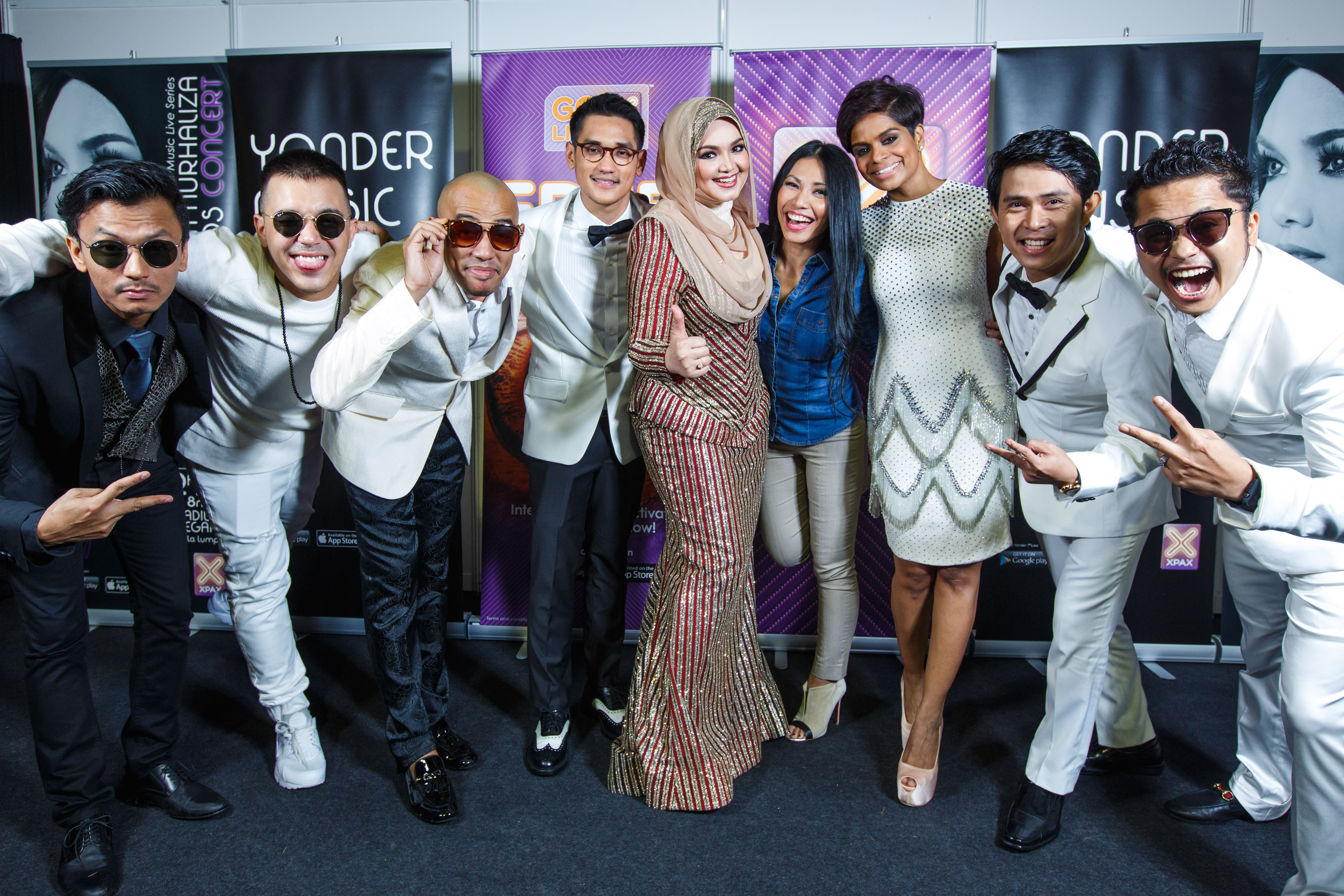
Siti Nurhaliza and her guest artists for Dato' Siti Nurhaliza & Friends Concert. From left, Faizal Tahir, SonaOne, Joe Flizzow, Afgansyah Reza, Siti Nurhaliza, Anggun, Jaclyn Victor, Cakra Khan and Hafiz Suip.

1. Act 1: Acoustic/Unplugged
  1. "Aku Cinta Padamu"
  2. "Percayalah"
  3. "Jaga Dia Untukku"
  4. "Terbaik Bagimu"
2. Act 2: Band
  1. Medley (Duet with Joe Flizzow and SonaOne)
    1. "Ku Mahu"
    2. "Ku Milikmu"
    3. "Destinasi Cinta"
  2. "Snow on the Sahara" (Duet with Anggun)
  3. "Bukan Cinta Biasa" (Duet with Anggun)
  4. "Cindai"
3. Act 3: Full Orchestra
  1. "Memories (Duet with Whitney Houston)
  2. "Jerat Percintaan"
  3. "Muara Hati" (Duet with Hafiz Suip)
  4. "Seluruh Cinta" (Duet with Cakra Khan)
  5. "Menatap dalam Mimpi"
  6. 20th Anniversary Medley
    1. "Seindah Biasa"
    2. "Kau Sangat Bererti"
  7. "Bagaikan Sakti" (Duet with Faizal Tahir)
  8. "Biarlah Rahsia" (Duet with Afgansyah Reza)
  9. "Lebih Indah"
4. Encore
  1. "Kau Ilhamku" (Duet with all guest artists)

Source: Adapted from concert's press release.

== Commercial performance ==
The free concert was officially announced on 2 March 2016. Since the tickets are not for sale, fans have to be subscribers and users of Celcom mobile communication service and Yonder Music mobile app respectively to stand a chance to win a pair of tickets per individual. Originally available to 6000 people, the seating arrangement for the concert was revised so that the stadium can fit an additional 1000 people. Adam Kidron, the CEO of Yonder Music commented on the addition as, "We felt the responsibility to answer the call of thousands of music fans that wanted their spot at the concert and worked tirelessly with stage and production crews on an adaptation of the event design in order to accommodate more fans". Until 22 March 2016, it was revealed that more than 6300 tickets have been redeemed.

On the night of the concert, it was reported more than 7000 people actually attended the event.

== Footnote ==
- Note 1: Jaclyn Victor's involvement as a guest artist for the concert has never been announced in either press conference (2 March and 23 March). It is possible that she was a last minute addition to the guest artist list.
