= Memories (Hugh Hopper song) =

1960s song by Hugh Hopper

"Memories" is a progressive rock song written by Hugh Hopper and recorded by a number of artists.

== Canterbury scene versions ==
Hopper wrote the song in the mid-1960s and it was originally recorded by his group The Wilde Flowers, although their versions were not released until many years later. The Wilde Flowers was a predecessor to the group Soft Machine, who also covered the song, as did associated artists Robert Wyatt (released as the B-side of his single "I'm a Believer" and on his compilation album Eps), and by Daevid Allen (on his album Banana Moon, with vocals by Wyatt).

Several versions by The Wilde Flowers were released on a compilation of their work in 1994.

== Material version ==
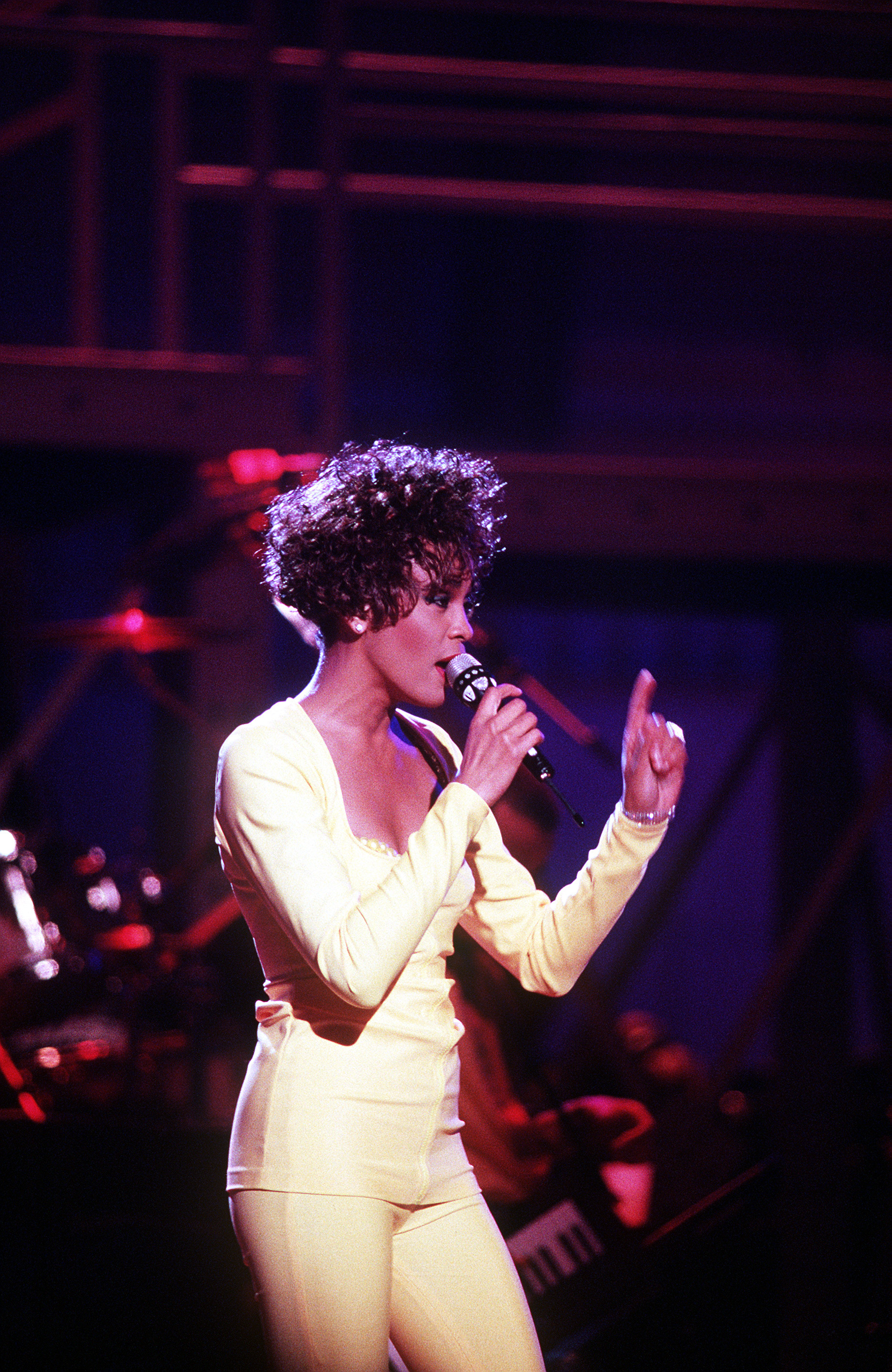
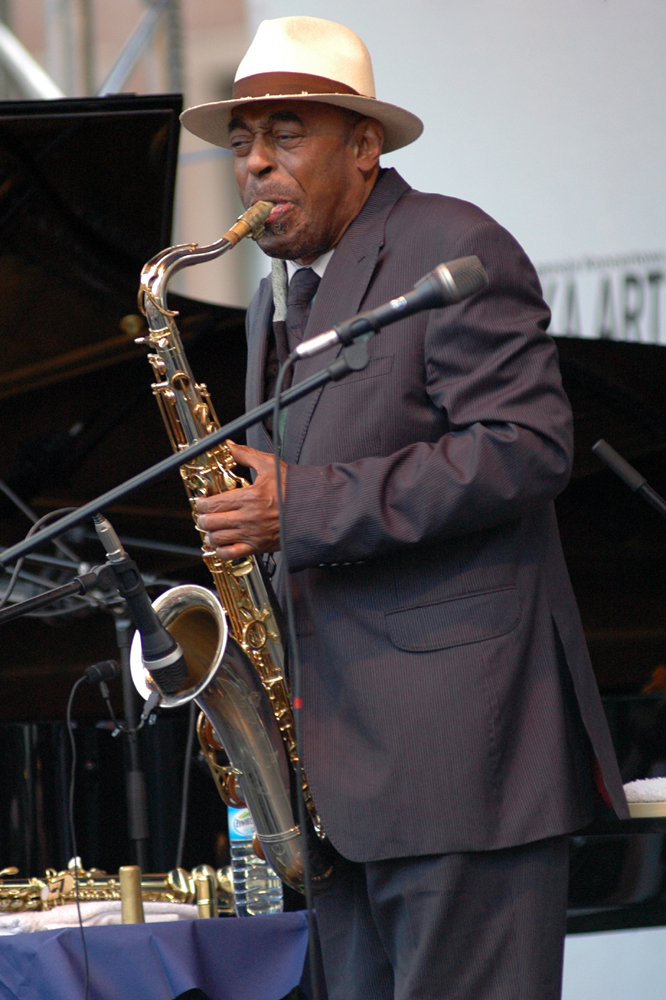
The 1982 version of "Memories" featured vocals by Whitney Houston and saxophone by Archie Shepp.

The song was covered in 1982 by the band Material on their album One Down, which featured lead vocals performed by Whitney Houston in her first-ever appearance as a lead vocalist on an album. It was produced by Bill Laswell. It also features a saxophone solo by Archie Shepp. Music critic Doyle Greene has called Houston's contribution to the song "commanding soul-pop vocals".

== The Mars Volta version ==
The song has also been covered by The Mars Volta, which was included as a bonus track on some versions of their album The Bedlam in Goliath.

== Siti Nurhaliza and Whitney Houston version ==
"Memories"

Single by Siti Nurhaliza and Whitney Houston
- Released: 2 April 2016 (First live performance); 10 December 2016 (Music streaming)
- Recorded: 1982 (Houston); 2016 (Nurhaliza)
- Genre: Pop; R&B
- Length: 3:25
- Label: Yonder Music
- Songwriter: Hugh Hopper
- Producers: Bill Laswell; J-Key; Adam Kidron; Aubrey Suwito

Siti Nurhaliza singles chronology
| "Dirgahayu" (2016) | "Memories" (2016) | "Segala Perasaan" (2017) |

Whitney Houston singles chronology
| "I Look to You" (2012) | "Memories" (2016) | "Higher Love" (2019) |

A cover version of "Memories" was recorded by Malaysian artist Siti Nurhaliza and featured vocals from American artist Whitney Houston taken from the 1982 Material cover of the song, recorded when Houston was 19. Houston had died in 2012. This rendition was first performed live at the Dato' Siti Nurhaliza & Friends Concert on 2 April 2016, a special concert to mark her 20th year in the Malaysian music scene. It was performed as a "digital duet" where Siti sang along with Houston's pre-recorded vocals.

The pairing was the idea of Adam Kidron, CEO of Yonder Music. On 10 December 2016, "Memories" was released exclusively on Yonder Music's streaming app and on the same day, its music video was televised on Astro Ria and published on Yonder Music Malaysia's YouTube account.

"Memories" marked Siti Nurhaliza as the second Malaysian artist to have a digital duet with a deceased musician, the first being KRU, a music group that in 1997 rerecorded a song that was performed by Tan Sri P. Ramlee, "Getaran Jiwa" ("Spiritual Vibrations") for the 1960 movie Antara Dua Darjat.

=== Background ===
In January 2016, Kidron revealed that one of his latest projects for Yonder Music was a special duet, where a chosen Malaysian singer will have a chance to have a duet with Houston. Although he did not name the artist, he did disclose that the song was originally recorded when Houston was only 19. He also revealed that in March 2016, a special free concert will be held for Yonder Music users. In the same month, Siti Nurhaliza revealed that she will have a special two-day concert organized by Yonder Music at the Plenary Hall of Kuala Lumpur Convention Center (KLCC) on 5 and 6 March 2016. She also told that during the concert she is going to perform a special song by Houston. On 2 March 2016, it was revealed that the two-day concert has been postponed to April and will be held at Stadium Negara for only one day. On 2 April 2016 during her Dato' Siti Nurhaliza & Friends Concert, she performed "Memories" for the first time, where it was performed as a "digital duet" where Siti sang as a duet with prerecorded Houston's vocals.

It was revealed that when Siti was asked by Kidron who are her favorite singers, she disclosed to him that she is a fan of P. Ramlee, Celine Dion and Whitney Houston. He later remembered that Houston's "Memories" has never been featured in any of her albums. According to Siti, "After they realized that I idolized Whitney Houston, Yonder suggested to combine my vocals and Whitney's through digital recording. It is a huge honor for me to be able to sing with Whitney even long after she had passed away." (Note: Original:"Selepas mendapat tahu saya mengidolakan Whitney Houston, pihak Yonder memberi cadangan untuk menggabungkan vokal saya dan Whitney secara rakaman digital. Ia merupakan suatu penghormatan yang besar buat saya kerana dapat menyanyi bersama Whitney walaupun dia telah meninggal dunia.")

=== Composition ===
A pop ballad, the song lasts for three minutes and twenty five seconds. While the 1982 version featured Houston's vocals and Archie Shepp's saxophone solo, in composing the 2016 version, the vocals of 37 years old Siti are paired with that of 19 years old Houston.

The original composition of Houston's "Memories" was produced by Bill Laswell, while the duet version was produced by J-Key and Kidron, with additional production by Aubrey Suwito.

=== Release and promotion ===
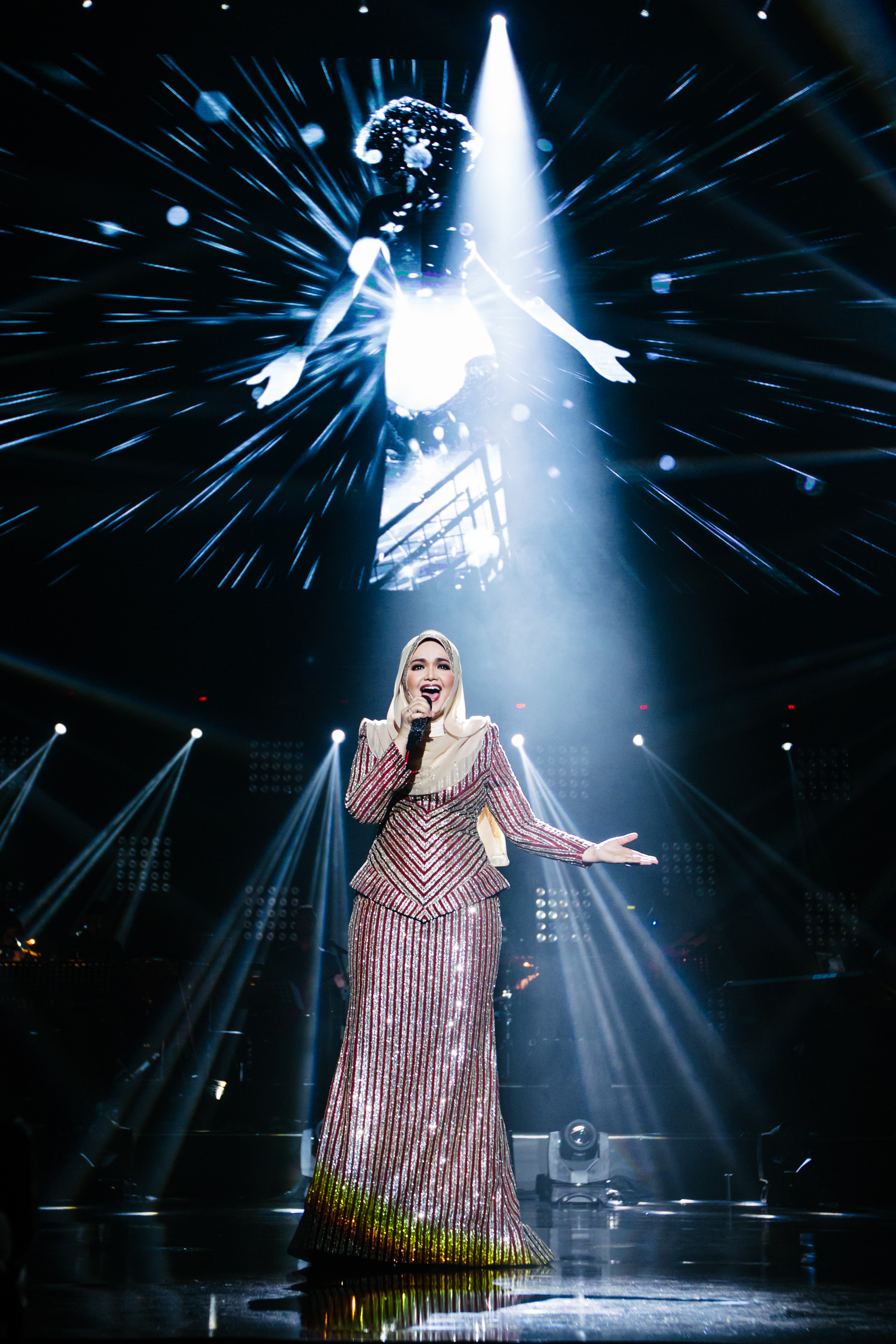
Siti performing "Memories" during Dato' Siti Nurhaliza & Friends Concert on 2 April 2016.

"Memories" was first performed live by Siti as a tribute to Houston at Dato' Siti Nurhaliza & Friends Concert on 2 April 2016. During the performance, Siti sang live while being accompanied by prerecorded Houston's vocals and Houston's images and pictures that were projected on the backdrop. While donning a striped sequin gold dress with a red base and side panels by Rizman Ruzaini, Siti performed "Memories" as a "digital duet" right in front of more than 7000 people who attended the concert that night. At the end of the performance, she cited the influence that Houston's songs had on her in order for her to learn proper vocal techniques. She also added, "With the advancement of modern technology today, I am able to sing a duet with my idol." (Note: Original:"Dengan kecanggihan teknologi hari ini, saya dapat berduet dengan idola saya.")

The debut live performance of "Memories" was well received by critics. Siti Athirah Dzulkifly of Utusan Malaysia called the duet as "unique", Bissme S. of The Sun reviewed it as "one of the highlights of the night", and Jemang Rahman of mStar praised it as "Siti continues to spellbind thousands of her audience with her impressive vocals" (Note: Original:"Siti terus memukau ribuan penonton dengan vokal mantapnya [...]") and the performance "will be remembered by the audience". (Note: Original:"amat terkesan diingatan penonton") At the end of the concert, music video for "Memories" was shot and recorded.

On 9 December, two video teasers for its music video were uploaded to Yonder Music Malaysia's official YouTube account. On 10 December, the single version of "Memories" was released for exclusive streaming on Yonder Music streaming app. On the same day, its music video premiered on both Astro Ria and Astro Ria HD and was published on Yonder Music Malaysia's official YouTube account on the same day.

=== Music video ===
Directed by Anusha Peterson with the original concept by Adam Kidron, the music video for "Memories" was recorded at the end of the Dato' Siti Nurhaliza & Friends Concert on 2 April 2016.

==== Synopsis ====
"Memories" music video was recorded separately for both Siti and Houston. All scenes involving Houston and her young look-alike were shot in black and white. The music video begins with audio and visual movie projector effects where places where Houston grew up in East Orange, New Jersey are shown – including images of New Hope Baptist Church, Dodd Street road sign (where her childhood home is located), her former elementary school, Franklin School (renamed to Whitney E. Houston Academy of Creative and Performing Arts in 1997) and her childhood home. In the next scene, a young Houston is shown to preparing herself in front of a mirror before heading outside of her childhood home where a taxi is waiting for her, ready to take her to a recording studio. In the next scene, preparations for Dato' Siti Nurhaliza & Friends Concert are taking place in Stadium Negara. The 1982 scenes in the United States and 2016 in Malaysia are shown one after the other before the title card for the music video is shown. Throughout the introduction, a male narrator narrates the song's background, history, and the historic collaboration between Siti and Houston in Bahasa Malaysia and English.

In the main portion of the music video, it begins with a scene showing a backdrop where a video of Houston singing the first lines of the song in a recording studio is projected. Later, Siti is shown to join Houston's video projection in singing the song back in Malaysia while she is being backed by a group of musicians on a stage. In between the scenes where Houston is in a recording studio in the United States and Siti is on a stage in Malaysia, scenes showing the audience waving their mobile devices (with their lights on) in the air are shown. Throughout the video, Siti and Houston took their turns in singing the song as a solo and as a duet. The music video ends with Siti concluding the performance and a picture of Houston is shown right behind her on the large backdrop to the cheers of the audience who are in attendance.

=== Credits and personnel ===
==== Song ====
- Adam Kidron – production
- Bill Laswell – original production
- Aubrey Suwito – additional production
- J-Key – production
- Dato' Siti Nurhaliza – vocals
- Whitney Houston – vocals

==== Music video ====
- Adam Kidron – concept
- Anusha Peterson – director
- Eman Azrin Azhar – additional post-production
- Hoh Jian Hui – editor
- Moon Choong – special effects supervisor
- Moon K Chan – executive producer
- Tunku Shafiq – producer
- Sidney Tan – designer director

American Production Team

- Marlon Films, LLC
- Angel Dejesus
- Veronica Fernandes

Malaysian Production Team

- Spaceboy Studios
- Visual Three Productions

Credits adapted from "Memories" music video credits.
