= Fragmen =

Studio album by Siti Nurhaliza
- Released: 30 June 2014
- Recorded: December 2012 – June 2014
- Genres: Pop, R&B
- Length: 35:11
- Labels: SNP, Universal Music Malaysia
- Producers: Aubrey Suwito; Faizal Tahir; Mike Chan; Ade Govinda

Siti Nurhaliza chronology
All Your Love (2011)	Fragmen (2014)	Konsert Lentera Timur, Panggung Sari Istana Budaya (2014)

Singles from Fragmen
- 1. "Lebih Indah" Released: 31 August 2013; 2. "Jaga Dia Untukku" Released: 4 May 2014; 3. "Terbaik Bagimu" Released: 15 October 2014; 4. "Seluruh Cinta" Released: 21 October 2014

Fragmen (Fragment) is a seventeenth studio album by Malaysian singer Siti Nurhaliza. It was released on 30 June 2014 by Universal Music Malaysia and her own Siti Nurhaliza Productions. Most of the songs in the album is inspired by her life and experiences. Recorded between late 2012 and mid-2014, the album saw a collaboration between Malaysian and Indonesian composers, lyricists and producers.

Fragmen has spawned four singles for the Malaysian market, "Lebih Indah" ("More Meaningful"), "Jaga Dia Untukku" ("Take Care of Him for Me"), "Terbaik Bagimu" ("The Best for You") and "Seluruh Cinta" ("All of Love"). In 2014, "Lebih Indah" received two nominations from 2014 World Music Awards in the category of World's Best Song and World's Best Music Video. In the same year, on 17 October, "Lebih Indah" also enabled Siti to win Best Artist (Female) and Best Song (Malaysia) awards from 2014 Anugerah Planet Muzik. Four days later, on 21 October, Fragmen and its singles were nominated in six different categories for 2014 Anugerah Industri Muzik. On 6 December, "Lebih Indah" and Fragmen also enabled Siti to win the Best Vocal Performance in a Song (Female) and Best Album from the 2014 Anugerah Industri Muzik. Her winning for "Lebih Indah" also marked the 12th time Siti winning the Best Vocal Performance in Song (Female) category.

On 21 October 2014, Fragmen was officially launched in Indonesia. Additional track, a duet with Cakra Khan, "Seluruh Cinta" was released as Fragmen's first single for the Indonesian market on the same day.

As of 27 August 2014, the album has been certified Platinum after it has been shipped for more than 10 000 copies. Less than three months later, Fragmen is estimated to be sold around 50 000 copies.

== Background and recording ==
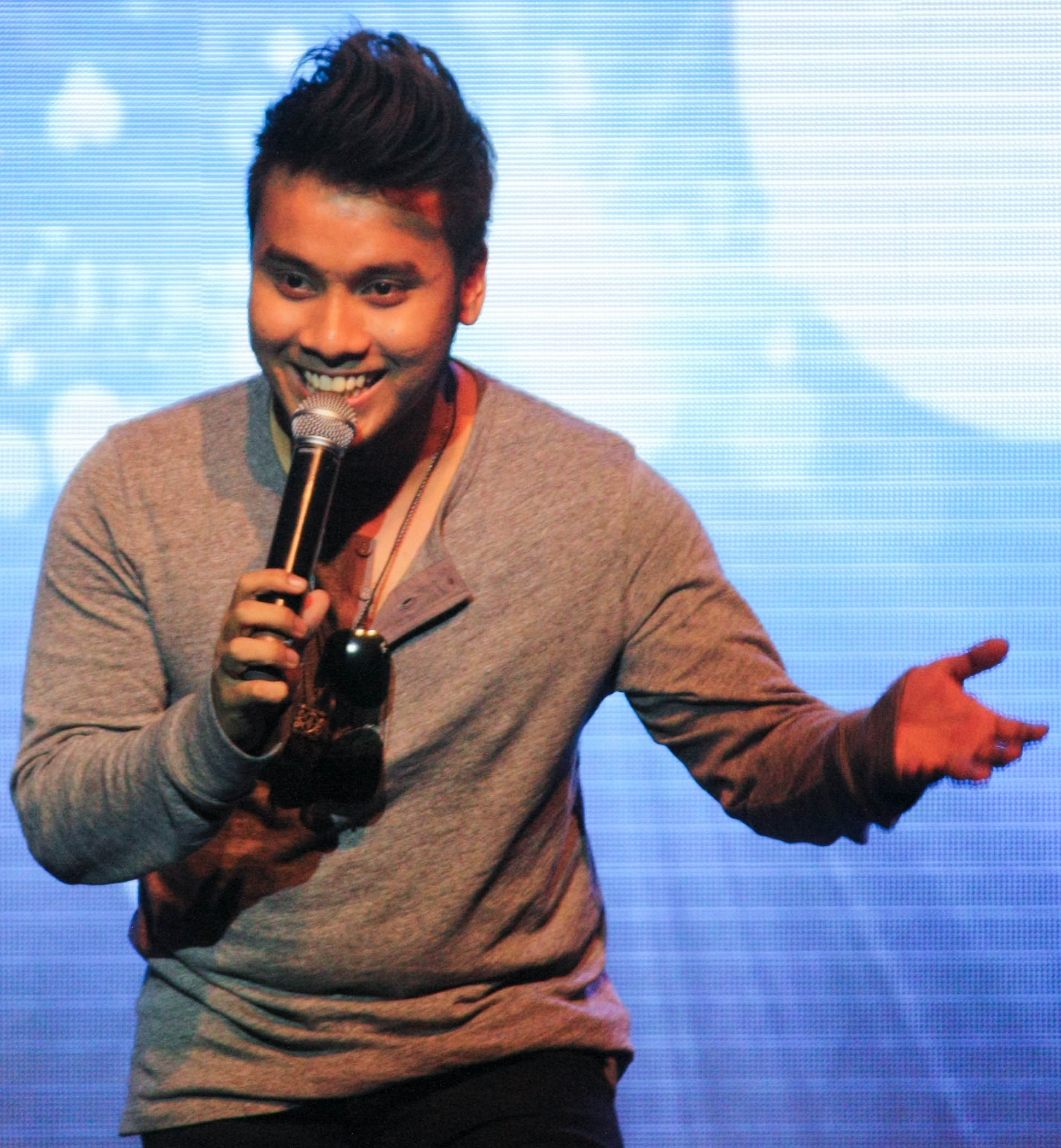
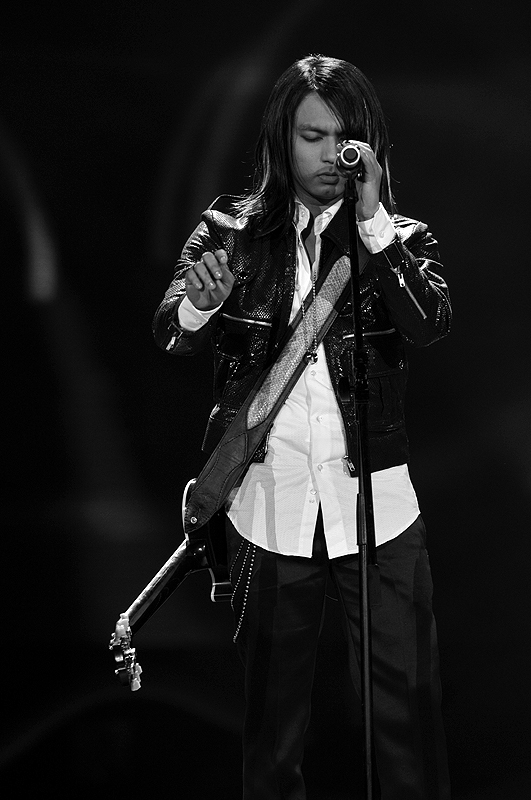
Fragmen marked Siti's first time working with contemporary Singaporean and Malaysian composers like Awi Rafael (left) and Faizal Tahir (right).

Fragmen is Siti's debut album through the collaboration of her own record company, Siti Nurhaliza Productions with Universal Music Malaysia since July 2011. The production of the album took place in October 2012 with the release of "Galau" ("Perplexed") on 11 January 2013. Though it was released digitally in January 2013, "Galau" was first performed during Dato' Siti Nurhaliza – Live in Kuantan 2012 concert in November 2012. However, when Fragmen was officially slated for release on 30 June 2014, "Galau" was dropped from the final track list. According to her management, the release of "Galau" was only intended as a promotional single to introduce the collaboration effort between Siti Nurhaliza Productions and Universal Music Group (Malaysia) to the public and not suitable for inclusion due to the differences of musical direction.

On 15 May, the first official single of the album, "Lebih Indah" was performed during the taping of her 90-minute special television program for Eid al-Fitr with TV2, Konsert Sanggar Lebaran Dato' Siti Nurhaliza. The show was aired much later, on 8 August. Recorded in 2013, the song is said to reflect the state of her emotions when she has to take care of her husband who was involved in a motorcycle accident in New Zealand in December 2012.

"The process of gathering songs took [us] three months. I received roughly about 40 songs. After all songs were evaluated with me, Universal Music and Siti Nurhaliza Productions itself, nine songs were chosen to be included into 'Fragmen'."

— Siti Nurhaliza on recording Fragmen (Note: Original:"Proses untuk mengumpulkan lagu mengambil masa tiga bulan. Saya dapat lebih kurang dalam 40 buah lagu. Selepas semua lagu menjalani proses penilaian bersama dengan saya, Universal Music dan pihak Siti Nurhaliza Productions sendiri, sembilan lagu dipilih untuk dimuatkan dalam ‘Fragmen’.")

In July, Universal Music Malaysia's A&R Director, Mujahid Abd Wahab revealed that the overall cost production that Universal has spent for this album reached almost RM 200 000. According to Mujahid, "The collaboration between Universal Music Malaysia and Siti is not only viewed from the sole perspective of profit only, in contrast, it is more than that. Universal Music Malaysia is willing to spend a large amount of expenditure for the creation of Siti's newest album since she is the country's asset. As the best singer, it is fitting that the album also matches her status." (Note: Original:"Kerjasama yang dijalin Universal Music Malaysia bersama Siti tidak melihat dari sudut perolehan semata-mata sebaliknya ia lebih daripada itu. Pihak Universal Music Malaysia sanggup mengeluarkan belanja besar untuk pembikinan album terbaru Siti memandangkan dia adalah aset negara. Sebagai penyanyi terbaik, sudah tentu albumnya harus setaraf dengan statusnya.") The RM 200 000 is said to only cover the production cost of the album alone.

In the process of the creation of the album, the album saw a collaboration of musicians, composers and technicians from multiple countries. The mastering of the album was done by Sterling Sound Studio in New York City. Ade Govinda, music composer from Indonesia who contributed "Terbaik Bagimu" is also one of the producers for the album.

Out of nine songs that are included in the album, three of them ("Mula dan Akhir", "Sanubari" and "Membunuh Benci")^{[note 2]} are chosen from her collaboration with "Bengkel Cipta Ekspres Badan Pelindung Hakcipta Karyawan Malaysia" (Music Author's Copyright Protection (MACP) Xpress Creation Workshop) on 25 April 2013. During the workshop, 10 music composers and 10 lyricists that were chosen were given three days to create 10 songs, before they were presented to Siti for her to evaluate their suitability to be included in her album. This marked her second time collaborating with MACP to find new materials for her album since her last traditional album, Lentera Timur.

Originally intended to be the tenth track for the album, "Seluruh Cinta", a duet with an Indonesia singer, Cakra Khan did not make the final cut of the album. The song which was recorded in three hours on 29 May 2014 at My Music, Jakarta Selatan, Indonesia was later revealed by Siti's management to be of a different project, though the possibility of its inclusion was actually considered. The song was finally included for the Indonesian version of Fragmen when it was officially launched and released on 21 October 2014.

== Artwork and title ==
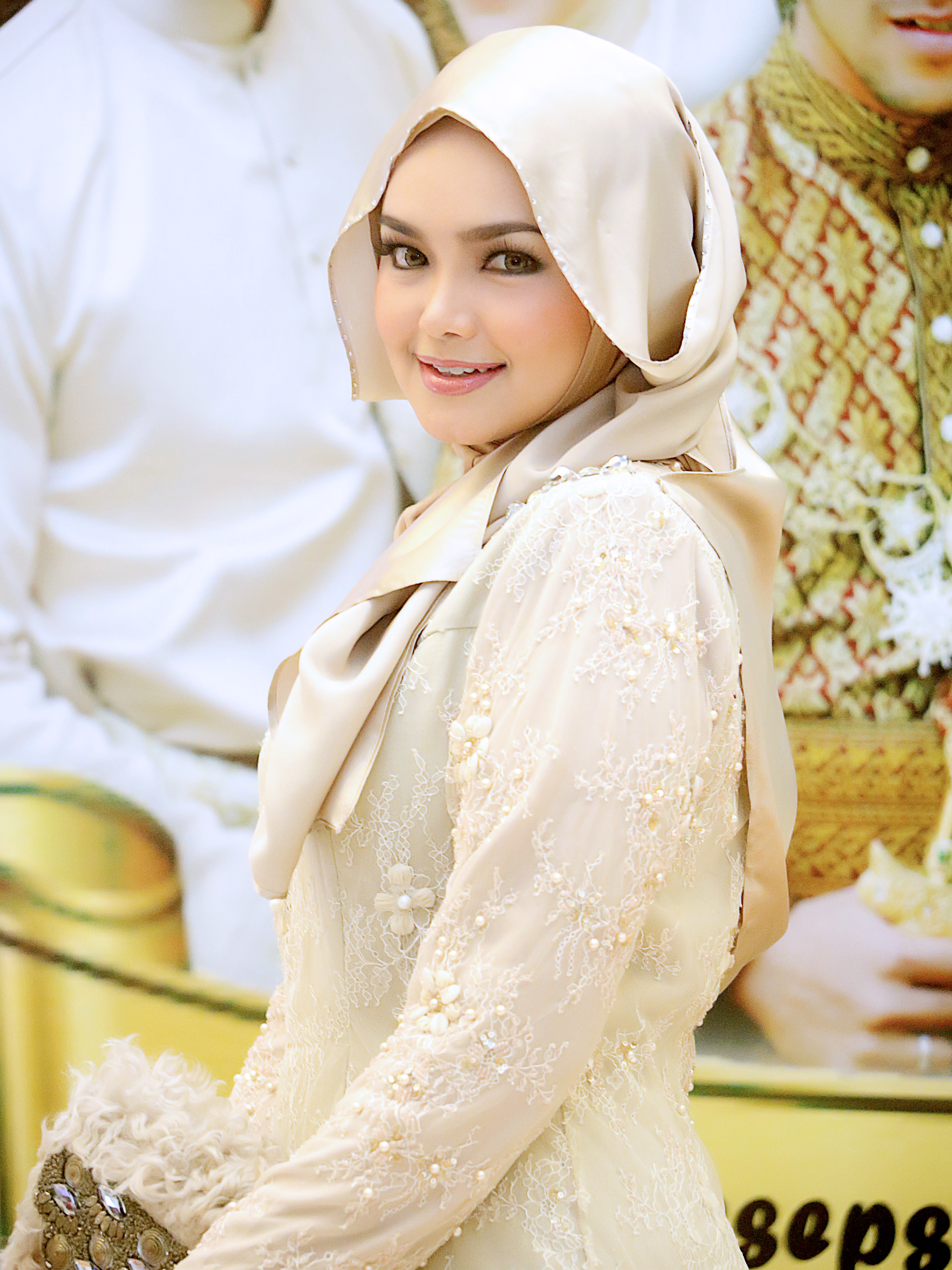
Siti Nurhaliza on 13 January 2013, two days after her birthday on 11 January, when she decided to don a full hijab, a new image that is also reflected on Fragmen’s artwork and inlay.

Shot by Bustamam Mokhtar, the album cover portrays Siti in a black ensemble. Siti explained on her choice of the black ensemble as, "Apart from the result of our discussion with the involved party in the creation of the album cover, I chose black because it is my favourite colour and it is perfect with the concept of elegance that I wanted." (Note: Original:"Selain hasil perbincangan bersama pihak yang terbabit dalam penghasilan kulit album, Siti memilih hitam kerana ia warna kesukaan Siti dan amat sesuai dengan gaya elegan yang Siti kehendaki.") The album also marked her first cover album with her wearing a hijab. She explained, "This is my first album that portrays me in a hijab. Even with hijab, I still want uniqueness and in the same time the image that is being shown is suitable with the element of pop that is present in the album. Therefore, I intentionally chose black for the dress because black looks elegant." (Note: Original:"Ini kali pertama kulit album yang merakam saya berhijab. Walaupun berhijab, saya inginkan kelainan dan dalam masa yang sama imej yang ditampilkan itu sesuai dengan elemen pop yang ada dalam album ini. Sebab itu, saya sengaja memilih warna hitam sepenuhnya untuk pakaian kerana hitam nampak elegan.")

Chosen by Rozi Abdul Razak, according to Siti, the album title is said "to picture a fragment of [my] life's tales, stories and experiences every day". (Note: Original:"...menggambarkan sebahagian daripada kisah, cerita dan peristiwa hidup sehari-hari.")

== Release and promotion ==
Prior to its official launch on 21 July, the album was released both physically and digitally on two separate dates. The physical copies of the album was released on 30 June, while the digital version of the album was released on 14 July 2014. The album was officially launched at Le Méridien, Kuala Lumpur on 21 July. Apart from various performances of her songs for various occasions, she also did several meet and greet sessions to promote Fragmen to both Malaysian and Singaporean fans on 24 August (Pavilion), 25 September (Universiti Teknologi Malaysia), Malaysia and 17 October 2014 (Tampines Mall), Singapore.

On 21 October 2014, the Indonesian version of Fragmen was officially launched and released at Artotel, Central Jakarta with an additional track, a duet with Cakra Khan, "Seluruh Cinta". During her visit to promote her album, she appeared on several days in a row on multiple Indonesian entertainment-based programs like radio programs and television channels including "Persembahan Cinta 23" on (MNCTV), "dahSyat" and "Superstars" on RCTI, "Inbox" on SCTV, "Ada Ada Aja" on Global TV and "Sarah Sechan" on NET.

=== Live performances ===
"Lebih Indah", the first official single of the album was first released as a digital release on iTunes on 31 August 2013. Prior to its official release, the song was first performed during the recording of her special television program for 2013's Eid al-Fitr, Konsert Sanggar Lebaran Dato' Siti Nurhaliza on 15 May. Later, it was performed again during her 2013 3-day Siti Nurhaliza in Symphony residency show on 5 to 7 July at Petronas Philharmonic Hall. In August, again in conjunction with the Eid al-Fitr week, she performed an unplugged version of "Lebih Indah" in a special television program for Eid al-Fitr, "Stailista Unplugged" which was aired on 8 August, on TV9. On 5 December, she performed "Lebih Indah" during the 2013 Asian Television Awards at Resorts World Sentosa, Singapore. On 14 December, as one of the performing artists, she performed "Lebih Indah" during the 20th Anugerah Industri Muzik. A week later, on 20 and 21 December, she performed "Lebih Indah" two days in a row during a special fund raising charity concert, "Konsert Destini", organised by Yayasan Destini Anak Bangsa (YDAB) and Universiti Teknologi MARA (UiTM). In 2014, on 4 January, as one of the performing artists during the launch of "Tahun Melawat Malaysia 2014" (Visit Malaysia Year 2014), she performed the song followed by a duet with Hafiz Suip with the song Muara Hati. The song was also performed during her two-day Secretaries' Week show, "Lebih Indah Bersama Datuk Siti Nurhaliza" on 15 and 16 April.

"Jaga Dia Untukku", the follow-up single of Fragmen was released on 4 May 2014.^{[note 3]} The song was first performed during her 2014 two-day fundraising concert, Dato' Siti Nurhaliza Live in Concert – Where the Heart is at Plenary Hall, Kuala Lumpur Convention Center on 8 and 9 February. For radio releases, Hot FM was the first radio station in Malaysia to broadcast the exclusive premiere for Malaysian listeners on 2 May. It was also performed live on 2014 Anugerah Planet Muzik.

"Terbaik Bagimu", Fragmen's third single, was first performed live during Siti's 2014 "Dato' Siti Nurhaliza – Live in Singapore" concert on 12 April 2014. It was also performed several times during her visit to Indonesia to promote the Indonesian version of Fragmen including – "Persembahan Cinta 23" (MNCTV) on 20 October 2014, "dahSyat" and "Superstars" on RCTI (21 October), "Inbox" on SCTV (22 October) and "Sarah Sechan" on NET.

"Seluruh Cinta" was first performed live by Siti and Cakra during MNCTV's special program in conjunction with its 23rd anniversary, "Persembahan Cinta 23" on 20 October 2014. The same song was performed on several days in a row on multiple Indonesian entertainment-based programs and television channels, including "dahSyat" on RCTI (21 October) and "Ada Ada Aja" on Global TV (22 October). "Seluruh Cinta" was also performed live during the taping of a one-hour talk show by Sarah Sechan on NET. which was broadcast on 1 November 2014.

== Singles ==
- The first single, "Lebih Indah" was released on 31 August 2013. The song is said by Siti "to immortalize the spirit and share the trying moments" (Note: Original:"mengabadikan semangat dan berkongsi perasaan saat menjaga suaminya") that she has to endure when she has to take care of her husband after he was involved in a motorcycle accident in New Zealand in December 2012. Starring Zain Saidin, Chacha Maembong and Ari, its music video also served as a commercial for her own line of eau de toilettes from her SimplySiti cosmetic range. The music video was released to YouTube on 30 May, two weeks after its first sneak peek during the first promotional tour of the eau de toilettes on 11 May. "Lebih Indah" has allowed Siti to win several local and international awards – Best Artist (Female) and Best Song (Malaysia) from 2014 Anugerah Planet Muzik and Best Vocal Performance in a Song (Female) from 2014 Anugerah Industri Muzik. The same song also received nominations from 2014 World Music Awards for World's Best Song and World's Best Music Video.
- The second single, "Jaga Dia Untukku" was released on 4 May 2014. The song is said to be inspired by her experiences in dealing with the news of her husband's motorcycle incident and her worries when taking care of him. Its music video was recorded at Puncak Pass, Cisarua, Kabupaten Bogor, Indonesia. The music video was first previewed to the media during the launch of her album on 21 July. It was performed live a number of times including on "Apa Saja FBI" on TV9.
- The third single, "Terbaik Bagimu" was released on 15 October 2014. It was first performed live during Siti's 2014 "Dato' Siti Nurhaliza – Live in Singapore" concert on 12 April 2014. During her visit to Indonesia to promote her album, she also performed "Terbaik Bagimu" for several times including – "Persembahan Cinta 23" (MNCTV) on 20 October 2014, "dahSyat" and "Superstars" on RCTI (21 October), "Inbox" on SCTV (22 October) and "Sarah Sechan" on NET.
- Its first Indonesian single, "Seluruh Cinta" was first performed live by Siti and Cakra during MNCTV's special program in conjunction with its 23rd anniversary, "Persembahan Cinta 23" on 20 October 2014. It was officially released on 21 October 2014 in with the launch of Indonesia version of Fragmen on the same day. The same song was performed on several days in a row on multiple Indonesian entertainment-based programs and television channels, including "dahSyat" on RCTI (21 October) and "Ada Ada Aja" on Global TV (22 October). "Seluruh Cinta" was also performed live during the taping of a one-hour talk show by Sarah Sechan on NET. which was broadcast on 1 November 2014.

== Reception ==
Within the first week of its release, Fragmen has been sold more than 5000 copies, thus making it eligible to receive Gold certification. As of 27 August, the album has been certified Platinum after it has been shipped for more than 10 000 copies. Less than three months later, on 20 November, it was revealed that the album had sold an estimated 50 000 copies.

== Track listing ==
No.	Title	Writer(s)	Producer(s)	Length
1.	"Aku"	Faizal Tahir, Mike Chan	Faizal Tahir, Mike Chan	3:42
2.	"Jaga Dia Untukku"	Aubrey Suwito, Rozisangdewi (Rozi AbdulRazak)	Aubrey Suwito	3:24
3.	"Mula dan Akhir"	Awi Rafeal, Tinta	Aubrey Suwito	4:14
4.	"Kau Sangat Bererti"	Hamid Mufari	Aubrey Suwito	4:20
5.	"Sanubari"	Adi Priyo, Ce'Kem	Mujahid Abdul Wahab, Aubrey Suwito	3:31
6.	"Terbaik Bagimu"	Ade Govinda, Jeje Govinda	Ade Govinda	4:10
7.	"Warna Dunia"	Lin Li Zhen, Rozisangdewi (Rozi AbdulRazak)	Aubrey Suwito	4:12
8.	"Membunuh Benci"	Acap, Hairul Anuar Harun	Aubrey Suwito	3:43
9.	"Lebih Indah"	Aubrey Suwito, Ad Samad	Aubrey Suwito	3:55
Total length:				35:11

Indonesian Version
No.	Title	Writer(s)	Producer(s)	Length
1.	"Seluruh Cinta"	Krishna Balagita	Krishna Balagita	4:10
2.	"Terbaik Bagimu"	Ade Govinda, Jeje Govinda	Ade Govinda	4:10
3.	"Aku"	Faizal Tahir, Mike Chan	Faizal Tahir, Mike Chan	3:42
4.	"Jaga Dia Untukku"	Aubrey Suwito, Rozisangdewi (Rozi AbdulRazak)	Aubrey Suwito	3:24
5.	"Mula dan Akhir"	Awi Rafeal, Tinta	Aubrey Suwito	4:14
6.	"Kau Sangat Bererti"	Hamid Mufari	Aubrey Suwito	4:20
7.	"Sanubari"	Adi Priyo, Ce'Kem	Mujahid Abdul Wahab, Aubrey Suwito	3:31
8.	"Warna Dunia"	Lin Li Zhen, Rozisangdewi (Rozi AbdulRazak)	Aubrey Suwito	4:12
9.	"Membunuh Benci"	Acap, Hairul Anuar Harun	Aubrey Suwito	3:43
10.	"Lebih Indah"	Aubrey Suwito, Ad Samad	Aubrey Suwito	3:55
Total length:				39:21

== Personnel ==
Credits adapted from Fragmen booklet liner notes.

Performers and musicians

- Abe Ryu – drums (track 3)
- Aji – guitar (track 3, 4)
- Andy Amrullah – violin (track 5)
- Cakra Khan – vocals (track 10)^{[note 4]}
- Damascus Panggah – cello (track 5)
- Dimawan Krisnowo Adji – piano (track 5), cello (track 5)
- Eko Baloeng – violin (track 5)
- Eko Murdiatmanto – viola (track 5)
- Dato' Siti Nurhaliza – vocals, background vocals (track 2, 4, 7)
- Evelyn Feroza – background vocals (track 1)
- Faizal Tahir – background vocals (track 1), guitar (track 1)
- Ginda Bestari – guitar (track 10)
- Junaidi – viola (track 5)
- Juwita Suwito – background vocals (track 2, 7)
- Ken Chung – bass (track 3)
- Oscara Artunes – violin (track 5)
- Saptadi – violin (track 5)
- Widy – background vocals (track 7)

Technical Personnel

- Acap – composer (track 8)
- Ad Samad – lyricist (track 9)
- Ade Govinda – record producer, composer (track 6), lyricist (track 6)
- Adi Priyo – composer (track 5)
- Aida Farhah – creation, design
- Annay.H – stylist
- Aubrey Suwito – record producer, composer (track 2, 9), synth (track 2–4, 9), production (track 2–9), arrangement (track 2–4, 7–9), recording (track 2–4, 7–9), piano (track 3, 8–9), strings (track 8)
- Awi Rafael – composer (track 3)
- Bustamam Mokhtar – photography
- Ce'Kem – lyricist (track 5)
- Dato' Siti Nurhaliza – executive producer
- Dimawan Krisnowo Adji – arrangement (track 5)
- Eko Sulistiyo – mixing (track 6)
- Emryl – promotional unit (Universal Music Group)
- Faizal Tahir – record producer, composer (track 1), lyricist (track 1), recording (track 1), arrangement (track 1)
- Felix Voon – mixing (track 1)
- Ferry EFKA – strings (track 6), keyboard (track 6)
- Galeri Ariani – wardrobe
- Hairul Anuar Harun – lyricist (track 8)
- Hamid Mufari – composer (track 4), lyricist (track 4)
- Ismael Arafat – mixing (track 5)
- Jay Franco (Sterling Sound) – mastering
- Jeje Govinda – additional production (track 6)
- Jonathan Liang – wardrobe
- Kamal – promotional unit (Universal Music Group)
- Krishna Balagita – lyricist, composer (track 10)
- Lentera Creative Home – props
- Lin Li Zhen – composer (track 7)
- Mike Chan – composer (track 1), lyricist (track 1), recording (track 1), synth (track 1)
- Mujahid Abdul Wahab – executive producer, record producer
- Nino – artist and repertoire
- Nizam Rahmat – creation
- Nurul Shukor (Nurul Shukor Touch) – make-up
- Rozisangdewi (Rozi Abdul Razak) – promotional unit (Siti Nurhaliza Productions), lyricist (track 2, 7)
- Sander Rino – promotional unit (Universal Music Group)
- Shamiera – promotional unit (Universal Music Group)
- Sunil Kumar – mixing (track 2–4, 7–9)
- Stephan Santoso – mastering, mixing (track 10)
- Syaiful Baharim – wardrobe
- Tinta – lyricist (track 3)
- Tito P. Soenardi – arrangement, strings arrangement (track 10)
- Tommy Utomo – recording (track 10)
- Zack – promotional unit (Universal Music Group)

== Awards ==
In 2014, Siti received five nominations from World Music Awards, three for herself (World's Best Female Artist, World's Best Live Act, World's Best Entertainer of the Year) and two for "Lebih Indah" (World's Best Song and World's Best Video). On 17 October 2014, Siti received two awards from 2014 Anugerah Planet Muzik in the category of Best Female Artiste and Best Song (Malaysia) for "Lebih Indah" in an award ceremony that involves musicians and artists from Indonesia, Malaysia and Singapore.

Year	Award	Recipients and nominees	Category	Result	Host country
2014	World Music Awards	"Lebih Indah"	World's Best Song	Nominated	Monaco
2014	World Music Awards	"Lebih Indah"	World's Best Video	Nominated	Monaco
2014	Anugerah Planet Muzik	"Lebih Indah"	Best Song (Malaysia)	Won	Singapore
2014	Anugerah Planet Muzik	"Lebih Indah"	Best Female Artiste	Won	Singapore
2014	Anugerah Planet Muzik	"Terbaik Bagimu"	Best Collaboration (Song)	Nominated	Singapore
2014	Anugerah Industri Muzik	Fragmen	Best Album Recording	Nominated	Malaysia
2014	Anugerah Industri Muzik	Fragmen	Best Album	Won	Malaysia
2014	Anugerah Industri Muzik	Fragmen	Best Album Cover	Nominated	Malaysia
2014	Anugerah Industri Muzik	"Lebih Indah"	Best Vocal Performance in a Song (Female)	Won	Malaysia
2014	Anugerah Industri Muzik	"Lebih Indah"	Best Musical Arrangement in a Song	Nominated	Malaysia
2014	Anugerah Industri Muzik	"Jaga Dia Untukku"	Best Pop Song	Nominated	Malaysia
2015	Anugerah Meletop Era	"Jaga Dia Untukku"	Penyanyi Meletop (Most 'Happening' Singer)	Won	Malaysia
2015	Anugerah Meletop Era	"Jaga Dia Untukku"	Lagu Meletop (Most 'Happening' Song)	Nominated	Malaysia
2015	Anugerah K-20 Karaoke Popular	"Jaga Dia Untukku"	10 Lagu Berbahasa Melayu Paling Popular 2014 (10 Most Popular Malay Songs in 2014)	Won(Ninth place)	Malaysia
2015	Anugerah Planet Muzik	"Jaga Dia Untukku"	APM Most Popular Song	Nominated	Singapore
2015	Anugerah Planet Muzik	"Seluruh Cinta"	APM Most Popular Song	Nominated	Singapore
2015	Anugerah Planet Muzik	"Seluruh Cinta"	Best Duo/Group	Nominated	Singapore
2015	Anugerah Planet Muzik	"Seluruh Cinta"	Best Collaboration (Artiste)	Won	Singapore

== Certification ==
Country	Certification	Sales/Shipments
Malaysia	Platinum	50,000

== Release history ==
Region	Release date	Format	Label
Malaysia	30 June 2014	CD	Universal Music Group (Malaysia)
Singapore	30 June 2014	CD	Universal Music Group (Malaysia)
Brunei	30 June 2014	CD	Universal Music Group (Malaysia)
Worldwide	14 July 2014	digital download	Universal Music Group (Malaysia)
Japan	9 August 2014	CD	Universal Music Group
Indonesia	21 October 2014	CD, Digital	Universal Music Group (Indonesia)

== Footnotes ==
- Note 1: Though it was reported that the album was released on iTunes on 9 July, the album was actually released on 14 July, as evident on the first available promotional post from Universal Music Group (Malaysia)'s Facebook account. The album however was available for streaming on 9 July on both Deezer and Spotify.
- Note 2: It is plausible that the song "Terbaik Bagimu" has been erroneously reported to be the product of Music Author's Copyright Protection (MACP) Xpress Creation Workshop since the song is written and composed by Indonesian composer and writers. According to MACP's official page, "Membunuh Benci" was composed by Acap and Hairul Anuar Harun during the 2014 workshop in April 2014, and may have been included in the album at the very last minute.
- Note 3: Though it was reported that the song was released on iTunes on 4 April, the song was actually released on 4 May, two days after she promoted the song to radio stations.
- Note 4: Track 10 refers to the additional song in the Indonesian version of Fragmen that is not available in the 9-track Malaysian version, "Seluruh Cinta".
