= Terbaik Bagimu =

Single by Siti Nurhaliza

from the album Fragmen
- Released: 15 October 2014
- Recorded: 2014; Cranky Music; (Petaling Jaya, Selangor)
- Genre: Pop
- Length: 4:10
- Label: Siti Nurhaliza Productions, Universal Music Group (Malaysia)
- Songwriter: Ade Govinda
- Producers: Ade Govinda, Aubrey Suwito

Siti Nurhaliza singles chronology
"Jaga Dia Untukku" (2014)	"Terbaik Bagimu" (2014)	"Seluruh Cinta" (2014)

"Terbaik Bagimu" (The Best for You) is a single by Malaysian artist Siti Nurhaliza. The third single from her seventeenth solo album, Fragmen, the song was composed by Ade Govinda, an Indonesian songwriter and lyricist.

First performed during Siti's 2014 "Dato' Siti Nurhaliza – Live in Singapore" concert on 14 April, the song revolves around the feeling of a wife who is striving to be the best for her husband but still feels it is not enough. The song was officially released as a single on 15 October 2014 in conjunction with her promotion of Fragmen in Indonesia. The song also served as a theme song on 3 February 2015 for a 14-episode Malay drama, "Nasuha" (Full Repentance), aired on TV9. In March 2015, it was also chosen as a theme song for a Malay telemovie, "Talak" (Divorce), on TV3.

On 5 September 2014, "Terbaik Bagimu" was nominated for the 2014 Anugerah Planet Muzik for the category of Best Collaboration (Song) in Singapore. Although no official music video was released, a lyric video was officially released on 4 May 2015.

== Background and recording ==
"The song is catchy, fresh and not too hard to understand. The lyrics for this song is a story about a wife's sacrifices. Taken from my own experience. I want the song to be able to be an inspiration to women anywhere. That we should give our best, no limits. If I can, so should other women."

— Siti Nurhaliza on recording "Terbaik Bagimu" (Note: Original:"Lagu ini catchy, fresh, tidak sukar dihayati. Lirik di balik lagu ini merupakan kisah pengorbanan seorang istri. Diambil dari pengalaman saya. Saya ingin lagu ini dapat menjadi inspirasi bagi wanita-wanita di mana saja. Bahwa kita harus memberikan yang terbaik, tak ada batasannya. Kalau saya bisa, maka teman-teman perempuan lain juga bisa.")

During the creation of Fragmen, Siti received a song offer from Universal Music Malaysia which she later accepted. According to Siti, "I received Ade's song from Universal Music Malaysia. I instantly wanted that song, because it is easy to listen to and to touch [my] feelings. 'Terbaik Bagimu' tells a story of how a wife who is giving the best [of her] to the husband but still feeling it is lacking". (Note: Original:"Siti mendapat lagu Ade dari Universal Music Malaysia. Siti langsung mau lagu itu, karena enak didengar dan sangat menyentuh perasaan," tambah Siti. 'Terbaik Bagimu' menceritakan tentang seorang istri yang mencoba memberi hal terbaik untuk suami tapi masih merasa pengorbanannya kurang.")

She also revealed that the original title, "Masih Kurang" (Insufficient), and certain parts of the lyrics were altered to deliver more positive connotations. She asked Ade's permission to alter a few elements of the lyrics and rename the song prior to recording it.

== Composition and lyrics ==
A slow tempo song, "Terbaik Bagimu" lasts four minutes and ten seconds. Written by Ade Govinda and composed by Ade and Jeje Govinda, the lyrics tell a story of how a wife feels that something is amiss even while she is trying to be the best for her husband.

== Release and promotion ==
Prior to its release as a single, the song was first performed by Siti for her 2014 "Dato' Siti Nurhaliza – Live in Singapore" concert on 14 April 2014. On 15 October 2014, the song was announced as the next single from Fragmen in conjunction with Siti's visit to promote Fragmen for the Indonesian market. During her promotional tour in Indonesia, she performed "Terbaik Bagimu" extensively, including multiple live performances for various television shows and programs, alongside "Seluruh Cinta", her main single from Fragmen for the Indonesian market.

In Malaysia, the song was also promoted heavily. Amongst the notable live performances for the song were Siti's 2015 unplugged concert on 7 April 2015 and a special Mother's Day showcase, "Mother’s Day Miracle Night with Dato' Siti Nurhaliza" on 15 May 2015. The song became a popular choice amongst Malaysian film makers. It was chosen as a theme song twice for two different shows by two different television stations during the first quarter of 2015. On 3 February 2015, "Terbaik Bagimu" was chosen as a theme song for a 14-episode Malay drama, "Nasuha" (Full Repentance), aired on TV9. A month later, on 22 March 2015, it was chosen as a theme song for a Malay telemovie, "Talak" (Divorce), on TV3.

== Music video ==
Although no music video for "Terbaik Bagimu" was ever filmed, Rumpun Records, a subdivision of Universal Music Malaysia, uploaded a lyric video for it on their official YouTube account on 4 May 2015.

== Live performances ==
Live performance of "Terbaik Bagimu" by Siti for MeleTOP on 17 February 2015.

"Terbaik Bagimu" was first performed long before the release of Fragmen. It was first performed live by Siti in Singapore on 14 April 2014 for her 2014 "Dato' Siti Nurhaliza – Live in Singapore" concert on 14 April 2014. The song was announced as the third single to be released from Fragmen on 15 October 2014, in conjunction with the plan to promote Fragmen in Indonesia, and started to be performed more frequently live. During Siti's visit to Indonesia in October 2014, the song was performed live for several Indonesian television programs and shows, including "Persembahan Cinta 23" (MNCTV) on 20 October 2014, "dahSyat" "Superstars" on RCTI (21 October), "Inbox" on SCTV (22 October), and "Sarah Sechan" on NET.

After Siti's return to Malaysia, she began to perform "Terbaik Bagimu" more frequently for the Malaysian market. On 22 November 2014, it was performed acoustically during her visit to Era FM. In 2015, "Terbaik Bagimu" was performed during an episode of MeleTOP on 17 February 2015. On 7 April 2015, it was performed acoustically again, this time for Dato' Siti Nurhaliza Unplugged 2015, as a special medley composed of three songs from Fragmen that were composed by Indonesian writers and musical composers. It was performed alongside "Sanubari" and "Kau Sangat Bererti". A month later "Terbaik Bagimu" was also performed for Siti's one-day showcase in conjunction with Mother's Day, "Mother's Day Miracle Night with Dato' Siti Nurhaliza", on 15 May 2015.

== Cover version ==
"Terbaik Bagimu" was one of two songs were chosen by the winner of Ceria Popstar 3, Dayang Izyan Zawanie Iraril, to sing for the finale of Ceria Popstar 3 on 12 June 2015.

== Credits and personnel ==
Credits adapted from Fragmen booklet liner notes.

- Ade Govinda – lyricist, composer
- Aubrey Suwito – production, recording
- Dato' Siti Nurhaliza – vocals
- Eko Sulistiyo – mixing
- Ferry EFKA – strings, keyboard
- Jeje Govinda – composer
- Recording for drums, guitar and bass was done at Casino Records.

== Chart performance ==
Chart (2015)	Peak position
Top 30 Singles Chart Malaysia	12

== Awards ==
Year	Award	Recipients and nominees	Category	Result	Host country
2014	Anugerah Planet Muzik	"Terbaik Bagimu"	Best Collaboration (Song)	Nominated	Singapore
