= Seluruh Cinta =

Single by Siti Nurhaliza and Cakra Khan

from the album Fragmen
- Released: 21 October 2014
- Recorded: 29 May 2014; MyMusic Records; (South Jakarta, Indonesia)
- Genre: Pop
- Length: 4:10 (Single)
- Label: Siti Nurhaliza Productions, MyMusic Records, Universal Music Group (Indonesia)
- Songwriter: Krishna Balagita
- Producer: Krishna Balagita

Siti Nurhaliza singles chronology
"Terbaik Bagimu" (2014)	"Seluruh Cinta" (2014)	"Mikraj Cinta" (2015)

Cakra Khan singles chronology
"Setelah Kau Tiada" (2013)	"Seluruh Cinta" (2014)	"Kau Memilih Dia" (2015)

"Seluruh Cinta" (All of Love) is a collaborative single by Malaysian artist, Siti Nurhaliza and Indonesian artist, Cakra Khan, released on 21 October 2014. The single was first released in Indonesia as part of the Indonesian version of Siti's seventeenth solo album, Fragmen. "Seluruh Cinta" also served as the first single from Fragmen for the Indonesian market. Siti and Cakra first met during 2013 Anugerah Planet Muzik where they sang together Cakra's single at that time, "Harus Terpisah".

The collaboration came to fruition when Siti was offered by Universal Music Group (Indonesia) to do a duet with any male Indonesian singer of her choice before finally choosing Cakra as her musical partner. Composed by Krishna Balagita, they recorded the song on 29 May 2014 at MyMusic Records in South Jakarta, Indonesia in under four hours.

The song was first performed live during MNCTV's 23rd special anniversary show, "Persembahan Cinta MNCTV 23" on 20 October 2014. In 2015, the song was chosen as the theme song for a Malaysian movie, "Suamiku Encik Perfect 10".

== Background and recording ==
Siti and Cakra first met and performed together during the 2013 Anugerah Planet Muzik where they sang together Cakra's single at that time, "Harus Terpisah". Afterward, she was contacted and asked by Universal Music Group (Indonesia) if she is interested to do a duet with any Indonesian singer of her choice. Admiring Cakra's unique vocals, she expressed her interest in having Cakra as her musical partner for the duet.

After the agreement has been reached, she travelled to Indonesia to record the song with Cakra at MyMusic Records' studio in South Jakarta, Indonesia on 29 May 2014. The whole recording session only took three to three hours and a half to complete. A teaser promoting the song was also shared by Siti on her Twitter account on the next day, 30 May. Prior to its exclusive release for the Indonesian market, its inclusion as the tenth track for the Malaysian version of Fragmen was actually considered.

== Composition and lyrics ==
A moderately fast song, the song stretches at four minutes and ten seconds. Composed by Krishna Balagita, according to Ramaloka's writer, the song revolves around the trying moments when one has to let his loved one go and pursue his/her dream while promising that one will always love and wait for him/her until they are back together.

== Release and promotion ==
To promote the release of the Indonesian version of Fragmen and her duet with Cakra, Siti embarked on a 5-day trip to Indonesia from 19 to 23 October. During her visit to Indonesia, she was invited to perform and take part in various Indonesian entertainment television programs. "Seluruh Cinta" was first performed live for MNCTV's 23rd anniversary special show, "Persembahan Cinta 23" where Siti and Cakra were invited to perform on 20 October. "Seluruh Cinta" was also performed on "dahSyat" on RCTI (21 October) and "Ada Ada Aja" on Global TV (22 October). Siti and Cakra also performed the song during the taping of "Sarah Sechan", a talk show by an Indonesian personality, Sarah Sechan, which was broadcast on 1 November 2014 on NET.

In 2015, the song was chosen as the theme song for a Malaysian movie, "Suamiku Encik Perfect 10".

== Live versions ==
"Seluruh Cinta" was first performed live by Siti and Cakra during MNCTV's special program in conjunction with its 23rd anniversary, "Persembahan Cinta 23" on 20 October 2014. The same song was performed on several days in a row on multiple Indonesian entertainment-based programs and television channels, including "dahSyat" on RCTI (21 October) and "Ada Ada Aja" on Global TV (22 October). "Seluruh Cinta" was also performed live during the taping of a one-hour talk show by Sarah Sechan on NET. which was broadcast on 1 November 2014.

In 2015, on 13 January, Siti and Cakra performed the song during the preview night of a Malaysian movie "Suamiku Encik Perfect 10" where the song was also chosen as the theme song for the movie.

== Credits and personnel ==
Credits adapted from Fragmen booklet liner notes.

- Cakra Khan – vocals
- Dato' Siti Nurhaliza – vocals
- Ginda Bestari – guitar
- Krishna Balagita – lyricist, composer
- Stephan Santoso – mastering, mixing
- Tito P. Soenardi – arrangement, strings arrangement
- Tommy Utomo – recording

== Chart performance ==
Chart (2014)	Peak position
Top 30 Singles Chart Malaysia	16

Chart (2015)	Peak position
Top 30 Singles Chart Malaysia	4

== Format and track listing ==
- Digital download
1. "Seluruh Cinta" – 4:10

== Radio and release history ==
Country	Date	Format	Label
Indonesia	21 October 2014	Digital download	Siti Nurhaliza Productions, MyMusic Records, Universal Music Group (Indonesia)
