= Juwita Suwito =

Malaysian singer, songwriter and vocal arranger

- Born: March 31, 1977 (age 48); Terendak Camp, Malacca, Malaysia
- Occupation: Singer-Songwriter/Vocal Arranger (Four Forty Records Sdn. Bhd.)

Juwita Suwito is a Malaysian singer, songwriter and vocal arranger. She is also the younger sister of Aubrey Suwito.

== Life and career ==
=== Early life ===
Juwita Suwito was born in Terendak Camp, Malacca, to a Chinese Indonesian father who served as a Methodist pastor and a Singaporean mother who was a church organist. (Note: This made her to be known as the first-generation Malaysian in her family.) She has an older brother named Aubrey Suwito, who is a pianist, keyboardist, songwriter, arranger and producer. She mainly spent her early years either in Tranquerah or Klebang Besar. She would float paper boats after every downpour in a field (Note: The field had a rain tree and would transform into a "shallow lake" after rainfall.) close to her Tranquerah home. She later learnt to play the piano and violin. Her family moved to Kuala Lumpur before she turned 10 where she received education from Bukit Bintang Girls' School in Brickfields, Kuala Lumpur.

=== Career beginnings and coaching ===
Juwita began pursuing her career in her late teens as a backing vocalist for leading Malaysian artistes at gigs, mega concerts and prominent award shows. She soon adapted to it and was frequently called upon for song recordings for East Asian publishing houses. She had her breakthrough when some of these recordings were regionally released and caught the attention of various curious listeners. “Breathe Again” was published by Warner Music Taiwan in the original soundtrack for ‘The Outsiders’ Taiwanese drama series. In July 2003, Suwito performed a song she wrote according to the theme ‘Leading Change' while representing Malaysia at the YWCA World Council & International Women's Summit in Brisbane. (Note: The song expressed her passion to persuade especially the younger generation to use their unique capabilities when born to contribute to the society. This received an enthusiastic response from the audience of about 1000 women from many different countries.)

In 2004, Suwito started coaching the finalists of the inaugural 'Malaysian Idol'. In recent years (as of 2008), she started guest coaching on reality shows, namely 'One in a Million' and 'Mentor'. She was also enlisted on the LG MyStarz mentoring team consisting of Malaysia's top musicians.

As of 2007, she has a full-time job as a YWCA Malaysia National General Secretary.

== Style ==
Juwita is known for touring around Malaysia, where she gets her song inspirations from listening to the local's stories. From there, she would like to present Malaysian culture through songwriting.

== Work ==
She has produced a few albums and soundtracks, including "Breathe Again" featured in The Outsiders, a Taiwanese TV show.

In 2007, she sang both the English and Malay version of Visit Malaysia Year theme song, named One Golden Celebration.

== Live performances ==
She performed together with her brother during the Malaysian Grand Prix Concert, featuring David Foster.
