= Lebih Indah =

Single by Siti Nurhaliza

from the album Fragmen
- Released: 31 August 2013 (Digital); 15 May 2013 (First live performance)
- Recorded: 2013; Cranky Music; (Petaling Jaya, Selangor)
- Genre: Pop
- Length: 3:54 (Single); 2:18 (Music video)
- Label: Siti Nurhaliza Productions, Universal Music Group (Malaysia)
- Songwriter: Ad Samad
- Producer: Aubrey Suwito

Siti Nurhaliza singles chronology
"Galau" (2012)	"Lebih Indah" (2013)	"Jaga Dia Untukku" (2013)

Music video
- "Lebih Indah" on YouTube

"Lebih Indah" (More Meaningful) is a single by Malaysian artist, Siti Nurhaliza. The song is composed by Aubrey Suwito, with its lyric written by Ad Samad. This is her first single from her 17th studio album, Fragmen. Originally intended to be a background song for one of the commercials for her SimplySiti product, it was later promoted as a proper single when it was performed live during her Siti Nurhaliza in Symphony concert in July 2013.

In 2014, the song received two nominations from 2014 World Music Awards in the category of "World's Best Song" and "World's Best Music Video". In the same year, "Lebih Indah" also enabled Siti to win Best Artist (Female) and Best Song (Malaysia) awards from 2014 Anugerah Planet Muzik.

== Background and recording ==
Originally intended to serve as the background music for the commercial, the song was promoted as a single in August, a month after the performance of the song at her Siti Nurhaliza in Symphony. The song is said to be recorded in 2013 by her in an attempt "to immortalize the spirit and share the trying moments" (Note: Original:"mengabadikan semangat dan berkongsi perasaan saat menjaga suaminya") that she has to endure when she has to take care of her husband after he was involved in a motorcycle accident in New Zealand in December 2012.

== Composition and lyrics ==
A moderately fast pop song, the songs lasts for three minutes and fifty four seconds. "Lebih Indah" is composed by Aubrey Suwito, with the lyrics written by Ad Samad. According to Siti, the song is said to reflect her emotional state when her husband was involved in a motorcycle accident in New Zealand in 2012.

== Release and promotion ==
Prior to the performance of the song during her 2013 3-day Siti Nurhaliza in Symphony residency show on 5 to 7 July, the song was first performed during her special television program for Eid al-Fitr, Konsert Sanggar Lebaran Dato' Siti Nurhaliza on 15 May. One of the commercials for her range of eau de toilettes from her own cosmetic line, SimplySiti, was also used as a medium to promote "Lebih Indah". Prior to its digital download release on 31 August, the song was performed again for another special television program for Eid al-Fitr, "Stailista Unplugged". Apart from "Lebih Indah", her previous single, "Galau" was also rendered in according to the unplugged theme of the program.

== Music video ==
=== Background ===
The music video was originally produced to promote SimplySiti's range of eau de toilettes - Him, Her and Miss. For the commercial, which was produced by Siti Nurhaliza Productions, Siti employed two actresses and one actor so that each of them represents a single line of eau de toilette. For the male range of eau de toilette (Him), she employed Zain Saidin to represent the range. Zain was chosen to represent the range because of his pan Asian features might help SimplySiti to break the international market, especially the Western Asia market when it is released. For Her and Miss, they were represented by Ari and Cha Cha Maembong respectively. A sneak peek of the music video was previewed at the first promotional tour of the eau de toilettes on 11 May. On 30 May, the music video was finally made available on SimplySiti's official YouTube account. The video that was released served as both a music video for "Lebih Indah" and a commercial for the eau de toilettes.

=== Synopsis ===
The music video begins with the scene showing the sole male character (portrayed by Zain Saidin) of the music video is driving an Aston Martin car, while his girlfriend (portrayed by Cha Cha Maembong) is sitting next to him and at times peeking out of the front passenger's window to enjoy the journey. While she is enjoying the journey, Zain is having a flashback to the moment when he met with Cha Cha's aunt earlier, whose reflection he saw in the rear-view mirror.

In his flashback, Cha Cha was shown to be showing Zain around her aunt's house. While she was busy explaining to an inquiry made by Zain about a painting, her aunt (portrayed by Ari) from behind was shown to be busy to talking to someone over the mobile phone. Zain immediately lost his focus upon smelling the fragrance that was worn by Ari. Realizing her aunt's presence was interrupting to the personal moments she was having with Zain, Cha Cha immediately tailed her aunt up the stairs which was followed by an argument. During the argument, the phone that Ari was holding was thrown off the floor followed by Cha Cha who is crying is going down the stairs. Zain who has noticed what had happened, went immediately up the stairs to pick the phone up. Unintentionally, their hands touched each other's when Ari was also trying to pick the phone up. While doing so, they finally established a close eye contact with each other before being interrupted by Cha Cha who came back to persuade Zain to leave the house.

After the flashback, the music video resumes back to the scene where Zain is shown to be driving. The music video ends with a scene showing the automobile is passing through a tunnel followed by a bright flash of light, and finally ends with a clip showing the three different ranges of eau de toilette by SimplySiti.

Since the music video was originally produced as a commercial for the new three ranges of eau de toilette by Simplysiti, Siti was only featured as vocals for the main background music. At two minutes and eighteen seconds, the music video is roughly one minute and thirty-six seconds shorter than the original length of the song.

== Live performances ==
The song was performed in public for the first time in 2013 during the taping of Konsert Sanggar Lebaran Dato' Siti Nurhaliza, her 90-minute special television program for Eid al-Fitr with TV2 on 15 May, which was later aired much later on 8 August. In July, it was performed again during her 3-day ( 5 to 7 July) residency show at Petronas Philharmonic Hall, Siti Nurhaliza in Symphony. In August, again in conjunction with the Eid al-Fitr week, she performed an unplugged version of "Lebih Indah" in a special television program for Eid al-Fitr, "Stailista Unplugged" which was aired on 8 August, on TV9. On 5 December, she performed "Lebih Indah" during the 2013 Asian Television Awards at Resorts World Sentosa, Singapore. On 14 December, as one of the performing artists, she performed "Lebih Indah" during the 20th Anugerah Industri Muzik. A week later, on 20 and 21 December, she performed "Lebih Indah" two days in a row during a special fund raising charity concert, "Konsert Destini", organised by Yayasan Destini Anak Bangsa (YDAB) and Universiti Teknologi MARA (UiTM).

In 2014, on 4 January, as one of the performing artists during the launch of "Tahun Melawat Malaysia 2014" (Visit Malaysia Year 2014), she performed the song followed by a duet with Hafiz Suip with the song Muara Hati. The song was also performed during her two-day Secretaries' Week show, "Lebih Indah Bersama Datuk Siti Nurhaliza" on 15 and 16 April.

== Cover versions ==
During the final of 2013 Akademi Fantasia, one of the finalists, Aisyah Aziz, covered the song for her second song choice. In 2014, "Lebih Indah" was chosen as one of the audition songs for the female contestants of 2014 Akademi Fantasia.

== Credits and personnel ==
Credits adapted from Fragmen booklet liner notes.

- Ad Samad – lyricist
- Aji – guitar
- Aubrey Suwito – record producer, composer, piano, synth, production, arrangement, recording
- Dato' Siti Nurhaliza – vocals
- Jay Franco (Sterling Sound) – mastering
- Sunil Kumar – mixing

== Chart performance ==
Chart (2014)	Peak position
Top 30 Singles Chart Malaysia	7^{[note 1]}

== Awards ==
=== World Music Awards ===
Year	Award	Recipients and nominees	Category	Result	Host country
2014	World Music Awards	"Lebih Indah"	World's Best Song	Nominated	Monaco
2014	World Music Awards	"Lebih Indah"	World's Best Video	Nominated	Monaco

=== Anugerah Planet Muzik ===
Year	Award	Recipient	Category	Result	Host country
2014	Anugerah Planet Muzik (Planet Music Awards)	"Lebih Indah"	Best Song (Malaysia)	Won	Singapore
2014	Anugerah Planet Muzik (Planet Music Awards)	"Lebih Indah"	Best Female Artiste	Won	Singapore

=== Anugerah Industri Muzik ===
Year	Award	Recipient	Category	Result	Host country
2014	Anugerah Industri Muzik	"Lebih Indah"	Best Vocal Performance in a Song (Female)	Won	Malaysia
2014	Anugerah Industri Muzik	"Lebih Indah"	Best Musical Arrangement in a Song	Nominated	Malaysia

== Format and track listing ==
- Digital download
1. "Lebih Indah" – 3:54

== Radio and release history ==
Country	Date	Format	Label
Malaysia	31 August 2013	Digital download	Siti Nurhaliza Productions, Universal Music Group (Malaysia)
Malaysia	September 2013	Contemporary hit radio	Siti Nurhaliza Productions, Universal Music Group (Malaysia)

== Footnote ==
- Note 1: This single could be charted higher than stated here, since the data by the Music Weekly Asia start to be available much later after the release of the single on 31 August.
