= Jaga Dia Untukku =

Single by Siti Nurhaliza

from the album Fragmen
- Released: 4 May 2014
- Recorded: January 2014; Cranky Music; (Petaling Jaya, Selangor)
- Genre: Pop
- Length: 3:23
- Label: Siti Nurhaliza Productions, Universal Music Group (Malaysia)
- Songwriter: Rozisangdewi (Rozi Abdul Razak)
- Producer: Aubrey Suwito

Siti Nurhaliza singles chronology
"Lebih Indah" (2013)	"Jaga Dia Untukku" (2014)	"Terbaik Bagimu" (2014)

Music video
- "Jaga Dia Untukku" on YouTube

"Jaga Dia Untukku" (Take Care of Him for Me) is a second single by Malaysian artist, Siti Nurhaliza from her seventeenth solo album, Fragmen. Written by Rozisangdewi, the song is composed and recorded by Aubrey Suwito in January 2014.

First performed during her 2014 Dato' Siti Nurhaliza Live in Concert – Where the Heart is, the song revolves around her feelings when she learned that her husband was involved in a motorcycle accident in New Zealand in December 2012. The song was officially released on iTunes on 4 May 2014.

This song also used as the theme song for the Malaysian television drama series, Rindu Awak 200% aired on TV3.

== Background and recording ==
"The emotion in this song is easy [for me] to express since I personally have gone through it. But I try to sing and translate [the song] with my own way. There are no scenes [in it] that show I am actually crying, in contrast it shows my fortitude in facing the difficulty."

— Siti Nurhaliza on recording "Jaga Dia Untukku" (Note: Original:"Emosi dalam lagu ini mudah ditonjolkan apatah lagi Siti sendiri melaluinya. Tapi Siti cuba alun dan terjemahkan dengan cara Siti. Tapi tiada babak yang menampakkan Siti seperti menangis, sebaliknya menampakkan sisi tabah saat berdepan kesukaran itu.")

The song was recorded in January 2014, in which it was inspired by her feelings when she learned her husband was involved in a motorcycle accident in December 2012. Much like other songs from Fragmen in which they describe the glimpses on her life, "Jaga Dia Untukku" is said by Siti to "translate all my feelings and those who were involved in it". (Note: Original:"...menterjemahkan segala perasaan Siti alami dan orang yang menghasilkannya.") Both composer (Aubrey Suwito) and the lyricist of "Jaga Dia Untukku", Rozisangdewi (Rozi Abdul Razak) were with her when the incident happened.

== Composition and lyrics ==
At three minutes and twenty three seconds, "Jaga Dia Untukku" is a song with a moderately fast tempo. Written by Rozisangdewi, the song is composed by Aubrey Suwito. The lyric of the song is all inspired by her experiences in dealing with the news of the incident and her worries when taking care of him. According to Zaidi Mohamad of Berita Harian, its lyric, "portrays the sadness and the pain that appears to be close to Siti in reminiscing how she dealt with the trying moments when her husband was involved in a road accident around late December of 2012 in New Zealand". (Note: Original:"...menggambarkan kedukaan dan penderitaan jiwa dilihat cukup dekat dengan Siti saat mengenang kembali bagaimana beliau berdepan suasana duka apabila suaminya terbabit dalam kemalangan jalan raya sekitar hujung tahun 2012 di New Zealand.")

== Release and promotion ==
The song was first performed during her 2014 two-day fundraising concert, Dato' Siti Nurhaliza Live in Concert – Where the Heart is at Plenary Hall, Kuala Lumpur Convention Center on 8 and 9 February. For radio releases, Hot FM was the first radio station in Malaysia to broadcast the exclusive premiere for Malaysian listeners on 2 May.

== Live performances ==
Apart from the debut of the song during the two-day 2014 Dato' Siti Nurhaliza Live in Concert – Where the Heart is on 8 and 9 February, the song was also performed during her two-day Secretaries' Week show, "Lebih Indah Bersama Datuk Siti Nurhaliza" on 15 and 16 April.

== Credits and personnel ==
Credits adapted from Fragmen booklet liner notes.

- Aubrey Suwito – record producer, composer, synth, production, arrangement, recording
- Dato' Siti Nurhaliza – vocals, background vocals
- Jay Franco (Sterling Sound) – mastering
- Juwita Suwito – background vocals
- Rozisangdewi (Rozi Abdul Razak) – lyricist
- Sunil Kumar – mixing

== Chart performance ==
Chart (2014)	Peak position
Top 30 Singles Chart Malaysia	4^{[note 2]}

== Awards ==
Year	Award	Recipients and nominees	Category	Result	Host country
2014	Anugerah Industri Muzik	"Jaga Dia Untukku"	Best Pop Song	Nominated	Malaysia
2015	Anugerah Meletop Era	"Jaga Dia Untukku"	Penyanyi Meletop (Most 'Happening' Singer)	Won	Malaysia
2015	Anugerah Meletop Era	"Jaga Dia Untukku"	Lagu Meletop (Most 'Happening' Song)	Nominated	Malaysia
2015	Anugerah K-20 Karaoke Popular	"Jaga Dia Untukku"	10 Lagu Berbahasa Melayu Paling Popular 2014 (10 Most Popular Malay Song 2014)	Won 9th place	Malaysia
2015	Anugerah Planet Muzik	"Jaga Dia Untukku"	Lagu Paling Popular APM (APM Most Popular Song)	Nominated	Singapore

== Format and track listing ==
- Digital download
1. "Jaga Dia Untukku" – 3:23

== Radio and release history ==
Country	Date	Format	Label
Malaysia	4 May 2014^{[note 1]}	Digital download	Siti Nurhaliza Productions, Universal Music Group (Malaysia)
Malaysia	2 May 2013	Contemporary hit radio	Siti Nurhaliza Productions, Universal Music Group (Malaysia)

== Footnotes ==
- Note 1: Though it was reported that the song was released on iTunes on 4 April, the song was actually released on 4 May, two days after she promoted the song to radio stations.
- Note 2: This single could be charted higher than stated here, since the data by the Music Weekly Asia start to be available much later after the release of the single on 4 May.
