= Biarlah Rahsia =

Single by Siti Nurhaliza

from the album Transkripsi
- Released: 22 January 2006
- Recorded: 11 November 2005
- Genre: Pop
- Length: 4:09
- Label: Siti Nurhaliza Productions, Suria Records
- Songwriters: Melly Goeslaw, Siti Nurhaliza
- Producer: Aubrey Suwito

Siti Nurhaliza singles chronology
"Pendirianku" (2005)	"Biarlah Rahsia" (2006)	"Bisakah" (2006)

Audio sample
- file; help

"Biarlah Rahsia" (Let It Be A Secret) is a song written and performed by Malaysian pop singer-songwriter Siti Nurhaliza and composed by Melly Goeslaw. The song was released as the first single from her twelfth album, Transkripsi. It earned the Best Song award at the Anugerah Planet Muzik in 2007. "Biarlah Rahsia" is, to date, Siti's most successful single from her Transkripsi album.

== Background and writing ==
The song was originally composed and written by Melly Goeslaw. Siti changed the lyrics after she heard the song for the first time, and she was credited for re-writing the lyrics.. Siti's vocal range in this song is G3-E5.

Rumours had it that this song was produced as a response to the heavy media pressure in 2006 whether she will marry Datuk Khalid Mohamad Jiwa (commonly referred to by Datuk K) or not. The title of the song "Biarlah Rahsia" (Let It Be A Secret) speaks for itself.

== Release ==
Siti premiered "Biarlah Rahsia" at the Anugerah Planet Muzik (a regional award show) in 2006 which was aired live from Singapore. The song was soon released to radio airplay in Malaysia.

== Music video ==
The music video for "Biarlah Rahsia" was shot in Indonesia. It was directed by Rizal Mantovani (also the director of Siti's "Percayalah", "Bukan Cinta Biasa" & "Seindah Biasa" music videos). According to Siti, the music video features only beauty shots.

The video was first shown on Astro Ria's Muzik@RIA on 4 July 2006. The video received mostly positive comments from viewers.

In the video, Siti appears in a black gown while walking in a beautiful wooden house. We can see Siti in her white cloth writing lyrics in the second chorus of the song. In some parts of the video, the lyrics appear according to the song. Floral motives can also be seen from the beginning and until the end of the video.

== Personnel ==
- Composer: Melly Goeslow
- Lyrics: Siti Nurhaliza
- Producer & Musical Arrangement: Aubrey Suwito
- Bass: Andy Peterson
- Mixing: Peter Chong

== Charts ==
Chart	Peak position
Malaysian Carta ERA	1
Malaysian Hot FM Tiga Puluh	1
Malaysian KL FM	1
Malaysian RED FM	1
Brunei Carta Pelangi	1
Brunei Kristal FM	1
