= Krishna Balagita =

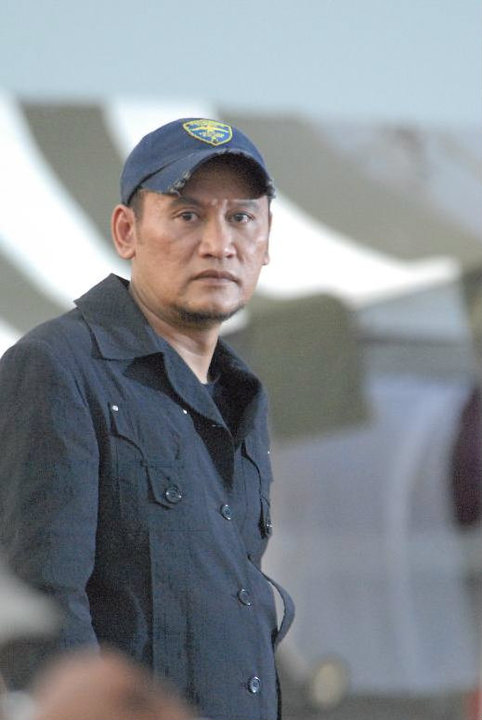

Background information
- Also known as: Krishna
- Born: Krishna Balagita; March 26, 1967 (age 59); Jakarta, Indonesia
- Genres: Jazz, pop
- Instruments: Piano, synthesizer
- Years active: 1996–present
- Member of: Ada Band; Krishna New Spectrum

Krishna Balagita, popular by his first name Krishna (born March 26, 1967, in Jakarta), is a Jakarta-born musician, arranger and composer. He achieved his popularity through Ada Band, a well-known band in Indonesia whose hit songs are written and created by Krishna.

== Career ==
Krishna started his professional career in music when he was 21. He joined some bands and performed in the café or hotel. Sometimes he would perform solo or played some pop music with a band. In other occasions, he would play standard tunes with a jazz quartet formation. He finally met Suriandika Satjadibrata and Baim in 1997. The three young men agreed to form a band called Ada Band. Seharusnya was the first album released in 1997 and the song with the same title got the success. Krishna successfully brought Ada Band to be one of the popular bands in the country. Masih, Yang Terbaik Bagimu, Haruskah Ku Mati, and Manusia Bodoh are some of the hit. Ada Band on the other hand was able to feature Dave Koz to play 'Masih'.

In a return to his roots, he released a jazz album 'Sign of Eight' in 2002, his first solo album. Indra Lesmana, Gilang Ramadhan, Dewa Budjana, Tohpati and Indro Hardjodikoro contributed to Krishna’s jazz project.

In 2007, Balagita formed his new project "Krishna and The New Spectrum". EMI music Indonesia produced the album, featuring many popular artists such as Ian Kasela, Dudi Yovie Nuno, Happy Salma, and Zacky 'Kapten'. This album was prepared in the orchestra touch.

== Discography ==
- Ada Band
  - Seharusnya (1997) -It Must be Love-
  - Peradaban 2000 (1999) -Year 2000-
  - Tiara (2000) -Desperately-
  - Metamorphosis (2003) -Metamorph-
  - Discography (2005) -Flash Back-
  - Heaven of Love (2004) -Heaven of Love-
  - Romantic Rhapsody (2006) -Romantic Rhapsody
  - Cinema Story (2007) -Cinema Story-
- Solo
  - Sign of Eight (2002) -Sign of Eight-
  - Light From Heaven (2007) -Light From Heaven-
