= Cakra Khan =

Indonesian singer

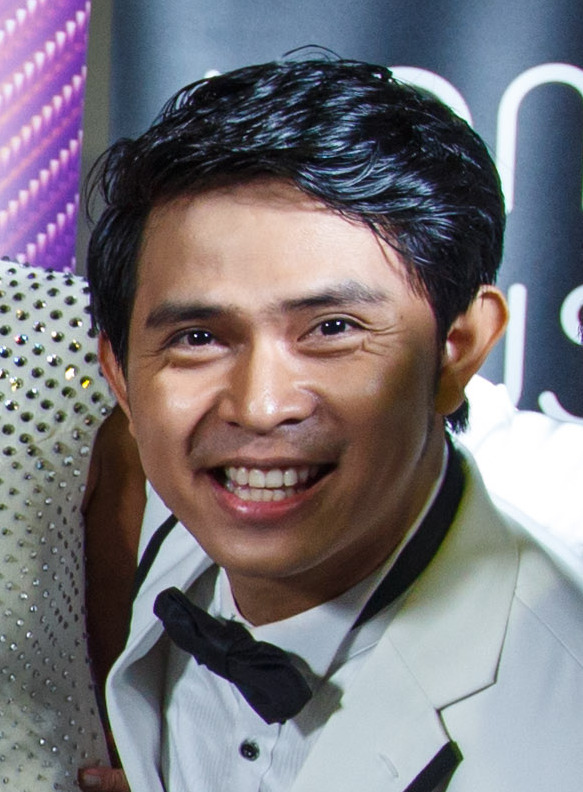
- Khan in 2016
- Born: 27 February 1992 (age 33); Parigi, West Java, Indonesia
- Citizenship: Indonesian
- Occupation: Singer
- Years active: 2010–present

Cakra Konta Paryaman (born 27 February 1992), known by his stage name Cakra Khan, is an Indonesian singer.

== Life and career ==
Cakra Konta Paryaman was born in Parigi, West Java, as the son of ethnic Sundanese parents Hermana and Entik Trisuyatmi. His popularity rose in 2012 after releasing his hit, "Harus Terpisah". During several events, he has collaborated with singer Helen Huang. Known for his husky voice, Cakra Khan is interested in soul music and graduated Sekolah Tinggi Musik Bandung in 2014. He is a Muslim.

== Discography ==
=== Studio albums ===
- Cakra Khan (2013)
- Divine (2024)

=== Soundtrack appearances ===
- Rudy Habibie (2016)

=== Compilation albums ===
- We Love Disney (2015)
- The Best Nada Kita (2016)
- Energy of Asia: Official Album of Asian Games 2018 (2018)
- My Beautiful Songs (2019)
- Masterpiece Maia Estianty (2020)
