= Aubrey Suwito =

Malaysian musician

- Born: 28 September 1966 (age 59); Malacca, Malaysia
- Education: Berklee College of Music
- Occupations: Composer; musician; producer (cranky music sdn bhd)

Aubrey Suwito is a Malaysian pianist, keyboardist, songwriter, arranger and producer. Aubrey Suwito started his musical journey at the age of 6 and has since written songs for various artists, most notably Gemilang for Jaclyn Victor which won multiple awards including the Asian Music Festival and Anugerah Juara Lagu. He was the musical director on Malaysian Idol. Aubrey also worked as musical director for the hit reality television talent search competition One in a Million. He is also the older brother of singer/songwriter Juwita Suwito. And he is a composer of Akademi Fantasia and Akademi Fantasi Indosiar theme song, namely Menuju Puncak.

== Early life ==
Suwito was born in Malacca to a Chinese Indonesian father who served as a Methodist pastor and a Singaporean mother. Aubrey himself started playing the piano at the age of 6. Aubrey's sister, Juwita Suwito, is also a vocal singer with a few albums under her belt. Upon completion of his A.B.R.S.M. Grade 8 Exam, he enrolled in the Berklee College of Music in Boston, United States in Fall 1991. After being exposed to the various kind of music styles while in Berklee, Aubrey took a fascination towards Jazz towards the end of the year 1991.

While he was pursuing his business studies in an A-Level course in Methodist College Kuala Lumpur (MCKL), he was 'offered' an opportunity to work with a professional recording studio. He eventually got a job there and his career took off from then on. Aubrey has steadily worked towards perfecting his craft amidst his busy schedule.

Aubrey has had his share of taking on the more commercially viable paths in music and has had a hand in some arrangements for albums in Taiwan, Hong Kong, Singapore and Malaysia. He is now co-director for Cranky Music Sdn Bhd.

Jazz has been a passion for Aubrey since 1992. As the keyboardist for a jazz outfit 'Face First', Aubrey has performed with the likes of vocalist Phil Perry and saxophone player Eric Marienthal during their performances in Kuala Lumpur.

== Personal life ==
He is of Indonesian and Singaporean descent.

== Published works ==
=== One Busy Street ===
Aubrey Suwito's debut album Malacca Sun was recently repackaged as One Busy Street. Malacca Sun was originally released in 2000 but as the original recording house closed down, the album is now a rare find.

One Busy Street features the likes of Gary Gideon, Shawn Kelly and Zahid Ahmad on drums, Andy Peterson and David Yee on Bass, Greg Lyons on the Saxophone, Hillary Ang and Fauzi Marzuki on the Guitar, Steve Thornton on Percussions, Mohar on the Malay Flute and Aubrey Suwito on the Piano.

=== Christmas With Friends ===
Aubrey Suwito and his wife came up with an idea to get fellow musicians to help other musicians in their time of need by organising a fundraiser concert in 2010. As the people whom he worked with throughout the project were mostly his friends, he decided to name the album 'Christmas With Friends'.

The musicians who worked with him on the Christmas album were Nan Alias (guitar), Mohd Rafi (guitar), Andy Peterson (bass), Steve Thornton (percussion), John Thomas (drums), Eddie Wen (trumpet), Kevin Choo (saxophone) and Chow Ming (trombone). The recording also includes the musical vocal talents of Jaclyn Victor, Juwita Suwito and Russell Curtis.

There were no sponsors for the concert but Aubrey did receive support from Dream Centre for the venue of the concert and personnel, and 8TV, for staging and lighting. 'Christmas With Friends' was recorded live at Dream Centre in August 2010 and a CD was released on 20 Nov the same year.

Although it was a free concert, a freewill collection was taken at the end of the concert and to-date a total of RM39,000 has been disbursed to nine musicians who needed medical help.

=== Home ===
Home is Aubrey's latest Malaysian-ize Jazz album which was released in Malaysia in November 2011 was recorded in just 3 weeks. The music of Home is a mix of Malaysian rhythms, pop-funk and jazz lines. It features Aubrey (as the arranger, composer and keyboardist), Jaclyn Victor (vocals), John Thomas (drums), Andy Peterson (bass), Aji (guitar), Saturnine's Nan (guitar), Fly Halizor (bass), Eddie Wen (trumpet), Kevin Choo (saxophone), Roger Chee (trombone), Mohram's Mohar (bamboo flute), and Steve Thornton (percussion).

Home was recorded and engineered by Sunil Kumar in Cranky Studio and mastered in Sterling Sound, New York.

According to Aubrey:

“In a country where ‘local’ and ‘foreign’ music have two distinct connotations, Home blurs the lines and redefines music as the universal language it has always set out to be"

“I believe my 'sound' is modern jazz with a twist of Malaysia. For example, on Kampong Boy, the melody is Malaysian-ish but the chords are based on the blues"

Album title	Published Year	Song Lists
Christmas with Friends	2010	Song Lists: 1. Carol Of The Bells; 2. God Rest Ye Merry Gentleman; 3. Noel; 4. Hark the Herald Angels Sing; 5. O Come All Ye Faithful; 6. Believe In Him; 7. What Child Is This; 8. Christmas Party; 9. Joy To The World; 10. Silent Night; 11. O Holy Night; 12. Santa Claus Is Coming To Town; 13. Go Tell It On The Mountain; 14. Jingle Bells
One Busy Street	2011	Song Lists: 1. Friday Fiddle; 2. Malacca Sun; 3. School's Out; 4. Gotta Go; 5. One Busy Street; 6. Sojourn's End; 7. Threesome; 8. In My Dreams
Home	2011	Song Lists: 1. Two Brothers; 2. Gummy Bear; 3. Kampong Boy; 4. Home; 5. What's That; 6. Out And About; 7. Counting Days (Feat. Jaclyn Victor); 8. This Time; 9. The Drive

== Awards ==
1. Asian Music Festival Award
2. Composer of Gemilang that won the Champion of Song Award or Anugerah Juara Lagu in Malay in 2005.
3. Producer for multiple albums that won the Music Industry Award or Anugerah Industri Muzik in Malay in 2004, 2006, 2007 and 2009.
