= List of awards and nominations received by Siti Nurhaliza =

Biduanita Negara Yang Hormat Dato’ Sri Hajah Siti Nurhaliza awards and nominations
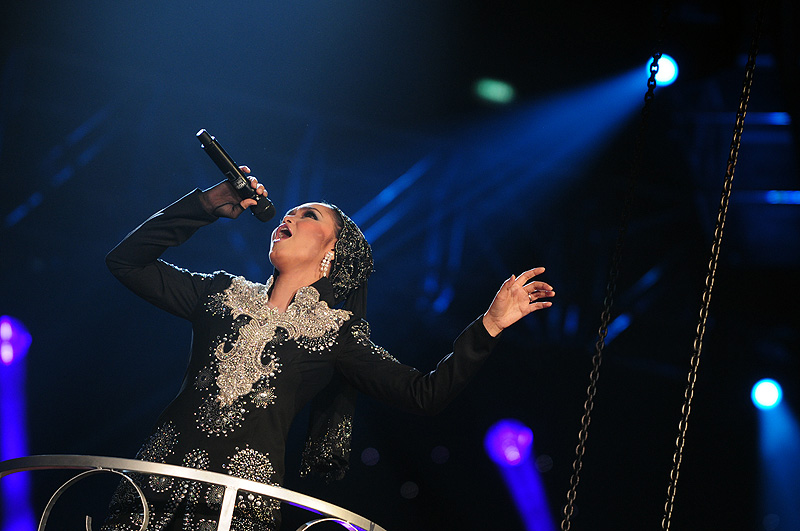
- Siti Nurhaliza performing as the opening act for Anugerah Juara Lagu ke-24 on 11 January 2010.
Awards and nominations
Award	Wins	Nominations
Anugerah ERA	13	27
Anugerah Industri Muzik	42	91
Anugerah Juara Lagu	22	35
Anugerah Planet Muzik	28	52
Anugerah Bintang Popular Berita Harian	31	35
Anugerah Musik Indonesia	3	3
Nickelodeon Kid's Choice Award	3	4
Shout! Awards	0	5
Shorty Awards	0	1
MTV Asia Awards	4	5
World Music Awards	3	13

Totals (Note: Certain award groups do not simply award one winner. They acknowledge several different recipients, have runners-up, and have third place. Since this is a specific recognition and is different from losing an award, runner-up mentions are considered wins in this award tally. For simplification and to avoid errors, each award in this list has been presumed to have had a prior nomination.)
- Wins: 361
- Nominations: 524 ^{[note 1]}

Siti Nurhaliza is one of the best-selling, most well-known and greatest artists in the Malay Archipelago, Nusantara region, and Southeast Asia. She has been Malaysia's most award-winning artist when her record was included in the Malaysia Book of Records in 2001 & 2004 and remained the record holder till now. To date, she has won more than 350 local awards as well as international awards making her the Top 50 Most Awarded Musician Of All-Time along with megastars like Michael Jackson, Beyoncé, Taylor Swift, BTS and many more.

She is a multiple record holders for various awards and accolades, so far she has received – 42 Anugerah Industri Muzik awards, 31 Anugerah Bintang Popular awards, 28 Anugerah Planet Muzik awards, 22 Anugerah Juara Lagu awards, four MTV Asia Awards, three World Music Awards, two Anugerah Musik Indonesia (Indonesian Music Awards) and the holder of five records in the Malaysia Book of Records.

== Music ==
=== Anugerah ERA (ERA Awards) ===
First organised in 2001, Anugerah ERA is an award ceremony that was then hosted by one of Malaysia's radio companies, Era FM annually from 2001 until 2007. The show was somehow absent for the years of 2008 and 2009. Artistes were voted on through SMS, phone call, and also through online and manual form, which could be faxed or mailed to their head office. In her debut in the award in 2001, she won all the categories for which she was nominated, which was five out of ten categories overall. She also holds the record for the highest number of wins for the category of Vokal Wanita Pilihan (Best Choice for Female Vocalist) winning five times.

Year	Nominee / work	Award	Result
2001	"Pandang-Pandang Jeling-Jeling"duet with Tan Sri S.M. Salim	Best Choice Ethnic Song	Won
2001	"Percayalah"	Best Choice Pop Song	Won
2001	"Percayalah"	Best Choice Music Video	Won
2001		Best Choice for Duo/Group Vocalist^{A}	Won
2001		Best Choice for Female Vocalist	Won
2002	"Kurik-Kundi"	Best Choice Ethnic/Global	Nominated
2002	"Nirmala"	Best Choice Ethnic/Global Song	Won
2002	"Nirmala"	Best Choice Music Video	Won
2002		Best Choice for Female Vocalist	Won
2003	"Badarsila"	Best Choice Ethnic/Global Song	Won
2003	"Bukan Cinta Biasa"	Best Choice Music Video	Won
2003	"Bukan Cinta Biasa"	Best Choice Pop Song	Nominated
2003	"Ku Milikmu"	Best Choice Music Video	Nominated
2003		Best Choice for Female Vocalist	Nominated
2004	"Bergendingdandong"duet with Tan Sri S.M. Salim	Best Choice Ethnic/Global Song	Nominated
2004	"Dialah Di Hati"	Best Choice Music Video	Nominated
2004	"Dialah Di Hati"	Best Choice Pop Song	Nominated
2004		Best Choice for Female Vocalist	Nominated
2005	"Lagu Rindu"	Best Choice Ethnic/Global Song	Nominated
2005	"Seindah Biasa"	Best Choice Music Video	Nominated
2005	"Seindah Biasa"	Best Choice Pop Song	Nominated
2005		Best Choice for Female Vocalist	Won
2006	"Biarlah Rahsia"	Best Choice Pop Song	Nominated
2006		Best Choice for Female Vocalist	Won
2006		Best Choice for Duo/Group Vocalist^{B}	Nominated
2007	"Pastikan"	Best Choice Pop Song	Nominated
2007		Best Choice for Female Vocalist	Won

- ^{A} She shared the award with Tan Sri S.M. Salim.
- ^{B} She was nominated with Too Phat.

=== Anugerah Industri Muzik (Music Industry Awards) ===
Anugerah Industri Muzik (AIM) is an annual event similar to Grammy Awards which recognised Malaysia's finest artists. Since her participation in 1997 with her debut single, Jerat Percintaan, she has won 42 awards, where she holds the record of highest frequency of winning Persembahan Vokal Terbaik di Dalam Album/Lagu (Wanita) (Best Vocal Performance in an Album/Song (Female)) winning 13 times out of 17 years of participation with some of the years with multiple nominations in the same category. She also holds the record of winning the most in the category of Album Terbaik (Best Album), winning seven times out of nine nominations.

The year indicates the ceremony year, awarding against the previous year's works.

Year	Nominee / work	Award	Result
1997		Best New Artist	Won
1997	"Jerat Percintaan"	Best Song	Won
1998	Siti Nurhaliza I	Best Pop Album	Nominated
1998	Siti Nurhaliza I	Best Vocal Performance in an Album (Female)	Nominated
1998	"Aku Cinta Padamu"	Best Song	Nominated
1999	Adiwarna	Best Pop Album	Won
1999	Adiwarna	Best Vocal Performance in an Album (Female)	Won
1999	Adiwarna	Best Album	Won
2000	Pancawarna	Best Pop Album	Nominated
2000	Pancawarna	Best Vocal Performance in an Album (Female)	Won
2000	Seri Balas (duet album with Noraniza Idris)	Best Pop Ethnic Album	Won
2000	Seri Balas (duet album with Noraniza Idris)	Best Album	Won
2000	"Hati Kama" (duet single with Noraniza Idris)	Best Song	Nominated
2000	"Nian Di Hati"	Best Song	Nominated
2000		Kembara Award	Special Award
2001	Sahmura	Best Vocal Performance in an Album (Female)	Won
2001	Sahmura	Best Pop Ethnic Album	Won
2001	Sahmura	Best Album	Nominated
2001	"Balqis"	Best Musical Arrangement in a Song	Nominated
2002	2001 Mega Concert Album	Best Vocal Performance in an Album (Female)	Won
2002	2001 Mega Concert Album	Best Pop Album	Nominated
2002	Safa	Best Vocal Performance in an Album (Female)	Nominated
2002	Safa	Best Pop Album	Nominated
2002	"Percayalah"	Best Song	Nominated
2003	Konsert Live Untukmu Sudir	Best Vocal Performance in an Album (Female)	Nominated
2003	Konsert Live Untukmu Sudir	Best Pop Album	Nominated
2003	Sanggar Mustika	Best Vocal Performance in an Album (Female)	Won
2003	Sanggar Mustika	Best Pop Ethnic Album	Nominated
2003	"Merisik Khabar" (from album Konsert Live Untukmu Sudir)	Best Musical Arrangement in a Song	Won
2003	"Nirmala"	Best Song	Nominated
2004	E.M.A.S	Best Vocal Performance in an Album (Female)	Won
2004	E.M.A.S	Best Pop Album	Won
2004	E.M.A.S	Best Album	Won
2004	E.M.A.S	Best Album Cover	Nominated
2004	"Bukan Cinta Biasa"	Best Musical Arrangement in a Song	Won
2004		Kembara Award	Special Award
2005	Prasasti Seni	Best Vocal Performance in an Album (Female)	Won
2005	Prasasti Seni	Best Album Cover	Nominated
2005	Prasasti Seni	Best Pop Album	Nominated
2005	Siti Nurhaliza Live In Concert 2004	Best Vocal Performance in an Album (Female)	Nominated
2005	"Bagaikan Sakti" (duet single with M. Nasir)	Best Musical Arrangement in a Song	Nominated
2005	"Dialah Di Hati"	Best Musical Arrangement in a Song	Nominated
2005	"Dialah Di Hati"	Best Song	Nominated
2005	"Seindah Biasa"	Best Musical Arrangement in a Song	Won
2005		Kembara Award	Special Award
2006	Siti Nurhaliza in Concert, Royal Albert Hall, London	Best Vocal Performance in an Album (Female)	Won
2007	Transkripsi	Best Vocal Performance in an Album (Female)	Nominated
2007	Transkripsi	Best Album Cover	Nominated
2007	Transkripsi	Best Pop Album	Won
2007	Transkripsi	Best Album	Won
2007	"Bisakah"	Best Video	Nominated
2008	Hadiah Daripada Hati	Best Vocal Performance in an Album (Female)	Won
2008	Hadiah Daripada Hati	Best Album Cover	Nominated
2008	Hadiah Daripada Hati	Best Pop Album	Won
2008	"Cintamu"	Best Musical Arrangement in a Song (Bahasa Malaysia)	Won
2008	"Hati"	Best Musical Arrangement in a Song (Bahasa Malaysia)	Nominated
2008	"Menanti Pasti"	Best Song	Nominated
2008	"Sekian Lama"	Best Musical Arrangement in a Song (Bahasa Malaysia)	Nominated
2008	"Sekian Lama"	Best Song	Nominated
2009	Lentera Timur	Best Pop Ethnic Album	Won
2009	Lentera Timur	Best Album	Won
2009	"Di Kayangan Kita"	Best Vocal Performance in an Album (Female)	Nominated
2009	"Di Kayangan Kita"	Best Pop Ethnic Song	Nominated
2009	"Di Taman Teman"	Best Vocal Performance in an Album (Female)	Won
2009	"Di Taman Teman"	Best Musical Arrangement in a Song	Nominated
2009	"Pada Cintanya"	Best Musical Arrangement in a Song	Won
2010	CTKD: Canda, Tangis, Ketawa, Duka (duet album with Krisdayanti)	Best Pop Album	Nominated
2010	Tahajjud Cinta	Best Pop Album	Nominated
2010	"Amarah" (duet single with Krisdayanti)	Best Vocal Performance in a Song (Group)	Won
2010	"Ku Percaya Ada Cinta"	Best Vocal Performance in a Song (Female)	Won
2010	"Sebagai Teman" (duet song with Krisdayanti)	Best Musical Arrangement in a Song	Nominated
2012	"I Cry Out"	Best Vocal Performance in a Song (Female)	Nominated
2012	"Stand Up"	Best Local English Song	Nominated
2013	"Galau"	Best Vocal Performance in a Song (Female)	Nominated
2014	Fragmen	Best Album	Won
2014	Fragmen	Best Album Cover	Nominated
2014	Fragmen	Best Engineered Album	Nominated
2014	Konsert Lentera Timur Dato' Siti Nurhaliza Bersama Orkestra Tradisional Malaysia	Best Engineered Album	Won
2014	"Lebih Indah"	Best Vocal Performance in a Song (Female)	Won
2014	"Lebih Indah"	Best Musical Arrangement in a Song	Nominated
2014	"Jaga Dia Untukku"	Best Pop Song	Nominated
2014	"Popaleh Weh"	Best Pop Ethnic Song	Nominated
2016	"Jaga Dia Untukku" (Live from Unplugged)	Best Musical Arrangement in a Song	Nominated
2016	"Menatap dalam Mimpi"	Best Musical Arrangement in a Song	Won
2016	"Menatap dalam Mimpi"	Best Pop Song	Nominated
2016	"Menatap dalam Mimpi"	Best Vocal Performance in a Song (Female)	Won
2016	"Mikraj Cinta"	Best Nasyid Song	Won
2016	"Mikraj Cinta"	Best Song	Nominated
2016	Dato' Siti Nurhaliza Unplugged	Best Engineered Album	Nominated
2016	Dato' Siti Nurhaliza Unplugged	Best Album	Won
2016	Herself	Choice Malaysian Artiste	Won
2025	Herself	Sri Wirama Award	Special Award

=== Anugerah Juara Lagu (Song Champion Awards) ===
Anugerah Juara Lagu (AJL) is a yearly event which recognised the musical composition of a song based on the collaborations of three parties - lyricist, composer and the artiste. Its weekly programme will gather singles and songs nominations from various artistes where they will compete till their songs are included as the finalists before ultimately nominated to be judged by professional judges. From 1986 until 1991, the finalists for the final were chosen based on monthly winners, and from 1992 until 2008, the songs were separated into three main categories - Ballad, Irama Malaysia and Ethnic Creative Song and also Pop Rock. However, from 2009 onwards, all of the categories were revamped and all final 12 finalists were made to compete against each other with no category limitations. Siti Nurhaliza holds three records of AJL - most overall wins (three times), highest number of songs and singles participating in the finals (18 songs) and artistes with the highest frequency of winning Persembahan Terbaik (Best Performance) with wins five times. In addition, her winning performance of Cindai during the final of AJL in 1998 won the title Champion of Champions where all past winners from 1986 till 2004 were voted on by the viewers in 2006.

Year	Nominee / work	Award	Result
1996	"Jerat Percintaan"	Best Ballad Song	Won
1996	"Jerat Percintaan"	Best Performance	Won
1996	"Jerat Percintaan"	Overall Winner	Won
1997	"Aku Cinta Padamu"	Best Ballad Song	Won
1997	"Aku Cinta Padamu"	Best Performance	Won
1998	"Bisikan Asmara"	Best Pop Rock Song	Nominated
1998	"Cindai"	Best Irama Malaysia and Ethnic Creative Song	Won
1998	"Cindai"	Overall Winner	Won
1998	"Wajah Kekasih"	Best Ballad Song	Nominated
1999	"Hati Kama" (duet single with Noraniza Idris)	Best Irama Malaysia and Ethnic Creative Song	Won
1999	"Purnama Merindu"	Best Ballad Song	Won
1999	"Satu Hati Dua Jiwa"	Best Pop Rock Song	Nominated
2000	"Balqis"	Best Irama Malaysia and Ethnic Creative Song	Won
2000	"Balqis"	Overall Winner	Won
2000	"Kau Kekasihku"	Best Ballad Song	Won
2000	"Nian Di Hati"	Best Ballad Song	Nominated
2001	"Engkau Bagaikan Permata"	Best Pop Rock Song	Won
2001	"Percayalah"	Best Ballad Song	Nominated
2001	"Ya Maulai"	Best Irama Malaysia and Ethnic Creative Song	Nominated
2001	"Ya Maulai"	Best Performance	Won
2002	"Bicara Manis Menghiris Kalbu"	Best Ballad Song	Nominated
2002	"Nirmala"	Best Irama Malaysia and Ethnic Creative Song	Won
2002	"Nirmala"	Best Performance	Won
2003	"Ku Milikmu"	Best Pop Rock Song	Nominated
2003	"Ku Milikmu"	Best Performance	Won
2005	"Cindai"	Viewers Choice Song	Won
2007	"Destinasi Cinta"	Best Pop Rock Song	Nominated
2015	Herself	AJL Icon (Anugerah Ikon AJL)	Special Award
2015	"Cindai"	Qu Puteh Diva	Won
2015	"Jerat Percintaan"	Qu Puteh Diva	Nominated
2020	"Anta Permana"^{A}	Best Song	Won 3rd place
2020	"Anta Permana"^{A}	Setel Fans Choice Awards (Anugerah Pilihan Peminat Setel)	Nominated
2021	"7 Nasihat"^{B}	Best Song Second Week - Semi Final Muzik-Muzik 35	Won
2021	"7 Nasihat"^{B}	Best Song	Pending
2021	"Aku Bidadari Syurgamu"^{C}	Best Song	Pending

- ^{A} The song was performed by Bob and Siti as featuring artist.
- ^{B} The song was performed by Shiha Zikir.
- ^{A} The song was performed by Aishah.

=== Anugerah Planet Muzik (Planet Music Awards) ===
Anugerah Planet Muzik (APM) is an annual event with the collaborations of three different countries - Indonesia, Malaysia and Singapore. Each year, different country will play host where it will gather all artists from the trio participating countries to compete for two main parts of the categories - Best Achievement (judged by professional judges from all three countries) and Most Popular (voted by voters from all participating countries and through Short Message Service (SMS) and forms in magazines). Since her participation in the very first version of APM, she has won 20 awards - nine times in a row for the category of Most Popular Female Artiste and five times winning the category of Best Female Artiste. In 2009, she was chosen by voters from all participating countries, for a new category as Regional Most Popular Artiste.

Year	Recipient/Nominated work	Award	Result	Host country
2001	"Balqis"	Most Popular Song	Won	Singapore
2001		Most Popular Female Artiste	Won	Singapore
2001		Best Female Artiste^{A}	Won	Singapore
2002		Most Popular Female Artiste	Won	Singapore
2002		Best Female Artiste	Won	Singapore
2002	Safa	Best Album	Nominated	Singapore
2002	"Percayalah"	Best Song	Nominated	Singapore
2003		Most Popular Female Artiste	Won	Malaysia
2003		Best Female Artiste	Won	Malaysia
2003		Special Award	Special Award	Malaysia
2004	"Bukan Cinta Biasa"	Most Popular Song	Won	Singapore
2004	"Bukan Cinta Biasa"	Best Song	Nominated	Singapore
2004	E.M.A.S	Best Album	Nominated	Singapore
2004		Most Popular Female Artiste	Won	Singapore
2004		Best Female Artiste	Won	Singapore
2005	"Bagaikan Sakti" duet with M. Nasir	Most Popular Song	Nominated	Singapore
2005	"Dialah Di Hati"	Best Song	Nominated	Singapore
2005	"Lagu Rindu"	Most Popular Song	Won	Singapore
2005		Most Popular Female Artiste	Won	Singapore
2005		Best Female Artiste	Nominated	Singapore
2006	"Dua Dunia" duet with Too Phat	Most Popular Song	Nominated	Singapore
2006		Most Popular Female Artiste	Won	Singapore
2007	"Biarlah Rahsia"	Most Popular Song	Nominated	Singapore
2007	"Biarlah Rahsia"	Best Song	Won	Singapore
2007	Transkripsi	Best Album	Nominated	Singapore
2007	Transkripsi	Best Female Artiste	Won	Singapore
2007		Most Popular Female Artiste	Won	Singapore
2008	"Menanti Pasti"	Best Song	Nominated	Malaysia
2008	Hadiah Daripada Hati	Best Female Artiste	Nominated	Malaysia
2008		Most Popular Female Artiste	Won	Malaysia
2009		Malaysia's Most Popular Female Artiste	Won	Indonesia
2009	Lentera Timur	Best Female Artiste	Nominated	Indonesia
2009		Regional Most Popular Artiste	Won	Indonesia
2011	"Amarah" duet with Krisdayanti	Best Collaboration	Nominated	Singapore
2011	CTKD: Canda, Tangis, Ketawa, Duka (duet album with Krisdayanti)	Best Album	Nominated	Singapore
2011		Regional Most Popular Artiste (For More than a Decade)^{B}	Won	Singapore
2013	"Muara Hati" duet with Hafiz	Best Malaysia Song	Nominated	Singapore
2013	"Muara Hati" duet with Hafiz	Best Duo/Group	Won	Singapore
2013	"Muara Hati" duet with Hafiz	Regional Most Popular Song	Won	Singapore
2014	"Lebih Indah"	Best Song (Malaysia)	Won	Singapore
2014	"Lebih Indah"	Best Female Artiste	Won	Singapore
2014	"Terbaik Bagimu"	Best Collaboration (Song)	Nominated	Singapore
2015	"Seluruh Cinta"	Best Collaboration (Artiste)	Won	Singapore
2015	"Seluruh Cinta"	Best Duo/Group	Nominated	Singapore
2015	"Seluruh Cinta"	APM Most Popular Song	Nominated	Singapore
2015	"Jaga Dia Untukku"	APM Most Popular Song	Nominated	Singapore
2015	"Menatap Dalam Mimpi"	Best Artiste (Female)	Nominated	Singapore
2015	"Engkau"	Best Collaboration (Song)	Nominated	Singapore
2017	"Dirgahayu"	Best Duo/Group	Won	Singapore
2017	"Dirgahayu"	Best Song (Malaysia)	Nominated	Singapore
2018	"Kisah Ku Inginkan" duet with Judika	Best Collaboration (Artist)	Won	Singapore
2018	"Segala Perasaan"	Best Female Artiste	Nominated	Singapore

- ^{A} She shared the award with Krisdayanti.
- ^{B} APM counts this single award as two, for both "Regional Most Popular Artiste" and "Regional Most Popular Artiste (For More than a Decade)".

=== Bintang HMI ===
Bintang Hiburan Minggu Ini (Bintang HMI) is a singing competition organised by RTM in search of new singers for the Malaysian music industry. In 1995, Siti competed in this competition before being ultimately revealed as the winner. During this competition, she met Adnan Abu Hassan, whom she received tutelage from during the competition. She also received offers of four singing contracts from four different labels, before ultimately choosing Suria Records, at the age of 16.

Year	Nominee / work	Award	Result
1995		Bintang HMI 1995	Winner

=== Hits 1 ===
Formerly known as Hits 1, Gah 1 is an annual competition where the top ten finalists will be competing against each other in the final. First broadcast by RTM in 2004, it bears a minor similarity with the concept of Anugerah Juara Lagu where the final ten contestants are placed in the finals based on weekly votes from viewers before ultimately judged by the professionals during the final.

Year	Nominee / work	Award	Result
2004	"Lagu Rindu"	Best Song	Second Place
2004	"Lagu Rindu"	Best Performance	Won
2004	"Lagu Rindu"	Most Popular Song^{A}	Won
2007	"Bisakah"	Best Song	Nominated

- ^{A} Voted by viewers through SMS.

=== Mentor ===
Mentor is a singing competition by TV3 where successful artistes will recruit one protégé each to teach and train them to become a better singer. Siti participated in this competition twice where in 2005 with Mohd. Fahmi Hj. Jaafar (Fahmi) and in 2006 with Siti Khadijah Hassan (Kat) where they end up winning the second runner up overall.

Year	Nominee / work	Award	Result
2006		Mentor (Second Season)	Third Place

== Popularity and commerciality ==
=== Anugerah Bintang Popular Berita Harian (Berita Harian's Most Popular Star Awards) ===
An annual event that was launched in 1987 which was known as Anugerah Pelakon/Penyanyi Popular (Popular Actor/Singer Award), Anugerah Bintang Popular Berita Berita Harian (ABPBH) is an award ceremony that recognises the most popular artistes of the year. The award is a yearly ceremony organised by one of Malaysia's newspapers, Berita Harian with results entirely based on votes cast by readers. For this award, Siti holds three records - highest number of wins in the category Artis Wanita Paling Popular (Most Popular Female Artiste) with 13 consecutive wins since her debut, and highest winning overall for Bintang Paling Popular (Most Popular Star) winning seven times, and the highest number of awards won overall which is 23 awards. In 2012, she received her 23rd award from ABPBH, a special award by the organiser for their Silver Jubilee celebration.

Year	Nominee / work	Award	Result
1996		Most Popular Teen Artiste	Won
1996		Most Popular TV Entertainer	Won
1996		Most Popular Female Singer	Won
1996		Most Popular Star	Won
1997–98		Most Popular Female Singer	Won
1997–98		Most Popular Star	Won
1998–99		Most Popular Female Singer	Won
1998–99		Most Popular Star	Won
2000		Most Popular Female Singer	Won
2000		Most Popular Star	Won
2001		Most Popular Female Singer	Won
2001		Most Popular Star	Won
2002		Most Popular Female Singer	Won
2003		Most Popular Female Singer	Won
2004		Most Popular Female Singer	Won
2004		Most Popular Star	Won
2005		Most Popular Female Artiste	Won
2006		Most Popular Female Artiste	Won
2007		Most Popular Female Artiste	Won
2008		Most Popular Female Artiste	Won
2009		Most Popular Female Singer	Won
2009		Most Popular Star	Won
2011		Anugerah Seri Perak (Special Category)	Won

Best Dressed Artist

The organizers of the awards ceremony also presented awards to both designer and artist who has created and worn respectively the Best Dress during the award ceremonial event. The artist's dress designer will be awarded with the Most Popular Fashion Designer award. For the Best Dressed Artist category, there are two subcategories, which are Best Dressed Artist (judged by professional judges) and Most Voted Best Dressed Artist (voted by readers and online voting). For three years in a row, from 2008 until 2010, Siti hired the same designer duo, Rizman Ruzaini who won three times in a row the Most Popular Designer with the artist who worn the design was awarded Most Voted Best Dressed Artist.

Year	Recipient	Award	Result
2005	Herself	Best Dressed Artist	Won
2008	Herself	Most Voted Best Dressed Female	Won
2009	Herself	Most Voted Best Dressed Female	Won
2010	Herself	Most Voted Best Dressed Female	Won

Online Category

Since the 25th editions of the awards ceremony, the organizers also presented other category for the awards ceremony. The online category was based on online voting.

Year	Recipient	Award	Result
2014	Herself	Artis Berpengaruh di Laman Sosial (Influential Artist in Social Media)	Won
2015	Herself	Artis Wanita Stailo (Stailo Female Artist)	Won
2016	Herself	Artis Aksi Selfie Popular (Action Selfie Popular Artist)	Nominated
2017	Herself	Artis Berpengaruh di Laman Sosial (Influential Artists In Social Media)	Nominated
2020	Anta Permana	Lagu Paling Boom Popular (Most Popular Boom Song)	Nominated

#FANtastik (Fan club Awards)

FANtastik is an event that involved artist's fan clubs, this event is in conjunction with Anugerah Bintang Popular Berita Harian (ABPBH) Ke-31 (31st Berita Harian's Most Popular Star Awards).

Year	Recipient	Award	Result
2018	Sitizone	FC Paling Infiniti (Most Infinity Fan Club)	Won
2018	Sitizone	Zumba (Game)	Won
2020	Sitizone	FC #FANtastik Popular (Popular FC #FANtastik)	Nominated

=== Anugerah K-20 Karaoke Popular ===
Anugerah K-20 Karaoke Popular (K-20 Popular Karaoke Awards) or also known as Anugerah Lagu Karaoke Popular Red Box (Red Box Most Popular Karaoke Song Awards) is an award recognise of the contributions and talent in the entertainment industry. This award organized by Red Box and the winner of the award was choosing by most plays song by customers at Red Box Karaoke Malaysia.

Year	Nominee / work	Award	Result
2015	"Jaga Dia Untukku"	10 Lagu Berbahasa Melayu Paling Popular 2014	Won 9th place

=== Anugerah K Neway ===
Anugerah Lagu Melayu Paling Popular Neway (Neway Most Popular Malay Song Awards) is an award to recognise of the contributions and talent in the entertainment industry. This award organised by Neway Karaoke Box Malaysia and makes its debut in 2013. The winner of the award was choosing by 12 most plays song by customers at Neway Karaoke Box Malaysia. In 2014, the organiser was organising the Anugerah K Neway 2014 (Neway K Awards). This time the awards have 8 categories and the winner will take from most plays song by customers (60%) and fan vote (40%). However, in view of the fatal tragedy of MH17 and MH370, the awards show had cancel as part of the respect to the nation who is mourning over the tragedy.

Year	Nominee / work	Award	Result
2013	"Muara Hati"	Neway Most Popular Malay Song	Won 5th place
2014	"Galau"	Karaoke Best Female Artiste (Artis Wanita Terbaik Karaoke)	Not Held
2015	Herself	Karaoke Best Female Artiste (Artis Wanita Terbaik Karaoke)	Won Gold

=== Anugerah Pilihan Online(APO) ===
Anugerah Pilihan Online 2016 or APO2016 was organized by The Star Online and Suria FM. The award gives an opportunity to the public to choose a winner. The winners will be decided by 70% online votes and remaining 30% will be decided by a panel of judges. The awards aim to recognize local personalities in all fields of entertainment, sports, fashion and business. It also to highlight those who are actively use the advantages of social media and cyberspace.

Year	Nominee / work	Award	Result
2016	Herself	Wanita Anggun Pilihan Dnars (Dnars Favorite Choice of Beautiful Women)	Nominated
2016	Herself	Ikon Fesyen Pilihan Online (Online Favorite Choice of Fashion Icon)	Won
2016	Herself	Penyanyi Wanita Terhebat Pilihan Online (Online Favorite Choice of Greatest Female Singer)	Won

=== Anugerah Pilihan Pembaca Media Hiburan (Media Hiburan's Readers' Choice Awards) ===
Anugerah Pilihan Pembaca Media Hiburan (APPMH) or formerly known as - Anugerah Media Hiburan, Anugerah Ceria Media Hiburan, Anugerah Personaliti Pilihan Pembaca Media Hiburan or Anugerah Personaliti Hiburan is an event where it recognised the artistes based on their aesthethical values. The event is under the responsibility of one of Malaysia's celebrity magazine, Media Hiburan.

Year	Nominee / work	Award	Result
1997		Most Beautiful Artiste	Won
1999		Most Sensationally Beautiful Artiste	Won
1999		Most Sensational Artiste	Won
2000		Most Sensational Ballad Singer	Won
2000		Most Sensational Pop Ethnic Singer	Nominated
2000		Most Sensationally Beautiful Artiste	Nominated
2001		Most Beautiful Artiste	Won
2002		Best Female Artiste	Won
2002		Special Award	Special Award
2004		Most Beautiful Artiste	Nominated
2009		Female Artiste With A Flawless Skin	Won
2009		Most Fashionable Female Artiste	Nominated
2009		Most Beautiful Artiste	Nominated
2009		Special Award	Special Award
2011		Icon Award	Won
2011		Favourite Celebrity	Nominated
2011		Female Artiste With A Flawless Skin	Nominated

=== Nickelodeon Kid's Choice Awards ===
First organised in 2004, Siti Nurhaliza is the first ever winner of the Malaysian version of Nickelodeon Kid's Choice Awards where she was voted by children and young teenagers as their favourite role model. She tied with Mawi for the most winning of the same category of Wannabe Award but she was chosen as the Most Nominated Artiste for that category with three nominations in 2006.

Year	Nominee / work	Award	Result
2004		Wannabe Award	Won
2005		Wannabe Award	Won
2006		Wannabe Award	Nominated
2006		Most Nominated Artiste	Won

=== Shout! Awards ===
Shout! Awards was first organised by 8TV in 2009 as a mean for the viewers and fans to vote for their favourite artistes for 15 different categories with finalists that have been chosen by a panel of professional judges where Siti was nominated for two categories. One new category was added in 2010 edition, which is the Mobile Artiste of The Year award.

Year	Nominee / work	Award	Result
2009		Popstar Award	Nominated
2009		Power Vocal Award	Nominated
2010		Popstar Award^{A}	Nominated
2010		Power Vocal Award^{A}	Nominated
2012		Popstar Award	Nominated

- ^{A} She is nominated with Krisdayanti.

== International accolades ==
=== MTV Asia Awards ===
Since its inaugural debut in 2002, MTV Asia has nominated Siti for the category of Favourite Artiste Malaysia five times, where she won four times consecutively from 2002 till 2005. She holds the record of the most winning, second to Stefanie Sun who has won six times. She also has been making performances for the awards thrice - 2003, 2004 and 2005.

Year	Recipient	Award	Result	Host country
2002	Herself	Favourite Artiste Malaysia	Won	Singapore
2003	Herself	Favourite Artiste Malaysia	Won	Singapore
2004	Herself	Favourite Artiste Malaysia	Won	Singapore
2005	Herself	Favourite Artiste Malaysia	Won	Thailand
2008	Herself	Favourite Artiste Malaysia	Nominated	Malaysia

=== International awards ===
Anugerah Hitz Minggu Ini (Hitz Minggu Ini Awards)

Anugerah Hitz Minggu Ini organized by Singapore radio Ria 89.7FM. This awards were part of the end of the Hitz Minggu Ini segment for year 2018.

Year	Recipient	Award	Result	Host country
2018	Herself	Artis HMI Paling Gerek	Nominated	Singapore
2018	Anta Permana	Lagu HMI Paling Gerek	Won	Singapore

Anugerah Musik Indonesia (Indonesian Music Awards)

Anugerah Musik Indonesia also known as AMI or colloquially AMI Awards is an annual Indonesian major music awards. They have been compared to the American Grammy Awards.

Year	Recipient	Award	Result	Host country
2000	Herself	Most Lucrative Foreign Artiste	Won	Indonesia
2003	E.M.A.S	Malaysia's Best Album	Won	Indonesia
2022	Alhamdulillah	The Best Islamic Spiritual Song Production Work (Karya Produksi Lagu Berlirik Spiritual Islami Terbaik)	Won	Indonesia

Big Apple Music Awards

The Big Apple Music Awards Foundation (BAMA) is a unique, multinational membership-based association composed of music industry professionals, musicians, producers, engineers and other creative and technical recording professionals who are dedicated to improving the quality of life and the cultural condition for Central Asian, Caucasian and Middle Eastern music and its makers both inside and outside the United States.

Year	Recipient	Award	Result	Host country
2015	Herself	Most Popular BAMA 2015 Artist	Nominated	Germany
2016	Herself	Best Malaysian Act	Won	United States
2016	Herself	Most Popular BAMA 2016 Artist	Nominated	United States
2016	Herself	Best Social Media Star 2016	Nominated	United States
2017	Herself	Best Malaysian Act	Nominated	United States

=== Daf BAMA Music Awards ===
First organized in 2015, Daf BAMA Music Awards is an international multicultural music award show that organized by Daf Entertainment based in Hamburg, Germany. This awards ceremony was recognize and honour the artists from all over the world and aim to unite the world with a beautiful music.

Year	Recipient	Award	Result	Host country
2017	Herself	BAMA's Best Female	Nominated	Germany
2017	Herself	BAMA's Best Performer	Nominated	Germany
2017	Herself	Best Asian Act	Nominated	Germany
2017	Herself	Best Malaysian Act	Won	Germany
2017	Herself	BAMA People's choice Award	Nominated	Germany
2018	Herself	Best Malaysian Act	Not Held	United Arab Emirates
2018	Herself	BAMA's Best Look	Not Held	United Arab Emirates

Dahsyatnya Awards

Dahsyatnya Awards is an award by Rajawali Citra Televisi Indonesia (RCTI), an Indonesian TV station, for the outstanding songs, albums, and artists based on the audience's vote.

Year	Recipient	Award	Result	Host country
2015	Herself	Bintang Tamu Terdahsyat (Outstanding Guest Star)	Nominated	Indonesia

Golden Panther Music Awards

The Golden Panther Music Awards is an international awards show that was present to the world's best-selling artists from each major territory in multiple musical genres, including Pop/Rock, Alternative Rock, Country, Rap/Hip-Hop, Soul/R&B, Adult Contemporary, Contemporary Inspirational, Latin, EDM and Soundtrack.

Year	Recipient	Award	Result	Host country
2018	Herself	Best Malaysian Act	Nominated	United States
2019	Herself	Best Malaysian Artist	Nominated	United States

Indonesian Box Office Movie Awards (IBOMA)

Indonesian Box Office Movie Awards (IBOMA) is an award by SCTV, an Indonesian TV station, for appreciation to the figures that have been directly involved in the Indonesia film industries.

Year	Recipient	Award	Result	Host country
2017	"Cindai"	Original Soundtrack Film Terbaik (Best Film Original Sound Track)	Nominated	Indonesia

Intuned Music Awards

Intuned Music Awards is an online award event where fans can cast their votes online for their favourites. For the inaugural event, with over 132 000 votes cast, Siti Nurhaliza won all seven awards out of seven nominations that she received.

Year	Recipient	Award	Result	Host country
2011	Herself	Favourite Artist	Won	Netherlands
2011	Herself	Best Female Solo (Female)	Won	Netherlands
2011	Herself	Most Promising Artist	Won	Netherlands
2011	Herself	Best Use of Social Media (Facebook/Twitter)	Won	Netherlands
2011	Herself	Sexiest Female Singer	Won	Netherlands
2011	All Your Love	Best Album	Won	Netherlands
2011	"Falling in Love"	Best Music Video	Won	Netherlands

McMillan Woods Global Awards

Siti Nurhaliza was the first Malaysian artist received for this award category. The award before was received by Hong Kong celebrities Ron Ng Cheuk Hei and an actress Ellane Kwong.

Year	Recipient	Award	Result	Host country
2016	Herself	Outstanding Singer of The Year	Won	Malaysia
2022	Herself	Most Inspiring Visionary Singer Of The Year	Won	Malaysia

SCTV Music Awards

SCTV Music Awards is an award by SCTV, an Indonesian TV station, for the most popular songs, albums, and artists based on the audience's vote.

Year	Recipient	Award	Result	Host country
2004	Herself	Top Foreign Artiste	Won	Indonesia

Silet Awards

Silet Awards is an annual award from Indonesian television program that broadcast on RCTI. This award to honour celebrities that become a part of this Silet television program.

Year	Recipient	Award	Result	Host country
2017	Seluruh Cinta	Theme Song Sinetron Tersilet	Won	Indonesia

Singapore Music Awards

Year	Recipient	Award	Result	Host country
1996	"Mawarku"	Most Popular Song	Won	Singapore
1996	Herself	Most Popular Newcomer (Female)	Won	Singapore

Shorty Awards

The Shorty Awards "honor the best of social media, recognizing the people and organizations producing real-time short form content across Twitter, Facebook, Tumblr, YouTube, Foursquare, and the rest of the social Web". According to the award rules, the six nominees with the highest rank in a selected Featured Categories at the end of the nomination period are the Shorty Awards finalists in that category. The most popular, relevant, and interesting categories will be submitted to The academy for judging. The academy does not choose a winner in every category.

Year	Recipient	Award	Result	Host country
2013	Herself	Best Reality Star in Social Media	Shortlisted	United States

The Muslim World Rania Award

The Muslim World Rania Award is given to individuals who have made outstanding contributions to the Muslim world in their respective professions by the Organisation of Islamic Cooperation (OIC) every year. The awards presented during a special ceremony in conjunction with the annual international trade event, the Muslim World Biz.

Year	Recipient	Award	Result	Host country
2019	Herself	The Muslim World Rania Award	Won	Malaysia

World Music Awards

The World Music Awards is an international awards show founded in 1989 that annually honours recording artists based on worldwide sales figures provided by the International Federation of the Phonographic Industry (IFPI). The awards show is conducted under the patronage of Albert II, Prince of Monaco and is based in Monte-Carlo, Monaco. On 13 December 2012 she was nominated for the first time for World Music Awards 2012 in two categories, which will be held in Miami, United States. However, the awards ceremony were postponed from 22 December 2012 to a later announced date.

Year	Recipient	Award	Result	Host country
2012	Herself	World's Best Female Artist	Not Held	United States
2012	Herself	World's Best Entertainer of the Year	Not Held	United States
2013	Herself	World's Best Female Artist	Not Held	United States
2013	Herself	World's Best Live Act	Not Held	United States
2013	Herself	World's Best Entertainer of the Year	Not Held	United States
2014	Herself	World's Best Female Artist	Nominated	Monaco
2014	Herself	World's Best Live Act	Nominated	Monaco
2014	Herself	World's Best Entertainer of the Year	Nominated	Monaco
2014	Herself	World's Best Malay Female Artist (Voted)	Won	Monaco
2014	Herself	World's Best Malay Live Act (Voted)	Won	Monaco
2014	Herself	World's Best Malay Entertainer (Voted)	Won	Monaco
2014	"Lebih Indah"	World's Best Song	Nominated	Monaco
2014	"Lebih Indah"	World's Best Video	Nominated	Monaco

YouTube Creator Awards

YouTube Creator Awards also known as YouTube Play Buttons, are an awards from YouTube that serves to recognize its most popular channels based on a channel's subscriber count. There are five types of awards, The Silver Creator Award (100,000 subscribers), The Gold Creator Award (1 million subscribers), The Diamond Creator Award (10 million subscribers), The Custom Creator Award (50 million subscribers) and The Red Diamond Creator Award (100 million subscribers).

Year	Recipient	Award	Result	Host country
2019	DatoSNurhalizaVEVO	The Silver Creator Award (YouTube Silver Play Button)	Won	United States
2019	Siti Official Video	The Silver Creator Award (YouTube Silver Play Button)	Won	United States
2021	Siti Nurhaliza (Under Suria Records)	The Silver Creator Award (YouTube Silver Play Button)	Won	United States
2021	Siti Nurhaliza (Under Siti Nurhaliza Production)	The Gold Creator Award (YouTube Gold Play Button)	Won	United States

=== International singing competitions ===
South Pacific International Song and Singing Competition

Year	Recipient	Award	Result	Host country
1999	"We'll Be As One"	Best Female Vocal Performance	Won	Australia
1999	"We'll Be As One"	Pop Winner/Top 40 Category International Song	Won	Australia

Shanghai Asia Music Festival

Asia New Singer Competition (simplified Chinese: 亚洲新人歌手大赛; traditional Chinese: 亞洲新人歌手大賽) is a singing competition established by Shanghai Cultural Development Foundation in Shanghai, China, featuring younger and relatively unestablished contestants from many Asian countries, although contestants from Europe and Oceania have also participated and won awards.

Year	Recipient	Award	Result	Host country
1999	Herself	Shanghai Asia Music Festival 1999 (Asia New Singer Competition)	Gold Award	China

The International Song Contest - The Global Sound

The International Song Contest was started in June 2012. The goal of the contest was to get countries together and showcase the importance of what music and culture by showcasing the various talents the world has. The contest is completely online voting for the final contestant and the winner will be vote by the host country juries. She was joined for the 7th and 14th edition of International Song Contest The Global Sound.

Year	Edition	Recipient	Award	Result	Host country
2014	7th	"Stand Up"	Overall	9th	Italy
2014	7th	"Stand Up"	Winner of Public Vote	Won	Italy
2019	14th	"Tak Perlu Ragu"	Overall	5th	Italy

Voice of Asia

Voice of Asia (Kazakh: Азия Дауысы, Azïya Dawısı; Russian: Голос Азии, Golos Azii) is a music festival, held annually in Almaty, Kazakhstan. Dozens of acts from all over Asia each take the stage over a period of several days and nights to perform their hit songs.

Year	Recipient	Award	Result	Host country
2002	Herself - Performed "Nirmala", "Purnama Merindu" and "Jalinan Cinta"	Voice of Asia 2002	Grand Prix Champion	Kazakhstan

=== TV shows ===
Asian Television Awards

Inaugurated in 1996, Asian Television Awards (ATA) is an award ceremony which is to recognise achievement by Asian television productions be it in performance, programming or even production. The winners are selected by a panel of more than 50 judges from the Asian region, where the results are tabulated and audited by an auditing firm, PriceWaterhouseCoopers.

Year	Recipient	Award	Result	Host country
2002	Concert Mega Siti Nurhaliza 2001	Best Entertainment Special	Nominated	Singapore
2005	Konsert Akustik Siti Nurhaliza	Best Entertainment Special	Highly Commended	Singapore
2012	Siti Nurhaliza The Biography Channel	Best Music Programme	Nominated	Singapore

== Product ==
=== Asia Halal Brand Awards ===
Asia Halal Brand Awards organised by Armani Media Sdn. Bhd. a publisher of Entrepreneur Insight. The awards got nominations from Malaysia, Japan, Taiwan, Indonesia, Thailand, Vietnam, Myanmar and Filipina. This awards to promote halal concept to the world.

Year	Recipient	Award	Result
2019	SimplySiti	Best Lipsticks	Won

=== BOSS Awards ===
BOSS Awards (BA) was organised by the Malaysian Association of ASEAN Young Entrepreneurs (MAAYE) to recognise the outstanding performers in the Malaysian and ASEAN young entrepreneur community. The awards aim to promote excellence, innovation and best practices in business entities.

Year	Nominee / work	Award	Result
2016	SimplySiti	People's Choice Awards	Nominated

=== Go Shop Anniversary Party ===
Go Shop, a home shopping platform service in Malaysia, enabling Malaysians to shop anytime and was aired at Go Shop Channel on Astro at 118 HD and 120 in Bahasa Malaysia or 303 HD in Mandarin and myFreeview Channel 120 HD. Go Shop had its 5th Anniversary Live Party and they were giving an awards to best-selling product.

Year	Edition	Recipient	Award	Result
2019	5th	SimplySiti	Best Halal Beauty Product Award (Anugerah Produk Kecantikan Halal Terbaik)	Won
2020	6th	SimplySiti (Argan Wonder)	Best Halal Beauty Product Award (Anugerah Produk Kecantikan Halal Terbaik)	Won

=== Halal Journal Awards ===
First launched in 2006 by The Halal Journal, one of the main objectives of this award is to give out support to the halal products and services from all over the world. Being the only Malaysian winner, her cosmetic and skincare range, SimplySiti took home the Best Product category.

Year	Nominee / work	Award	Result
2010	SimplySiti	Best Halal Product	Won

=== Halfest Awards ===
Halal Fiest Malaysia or more commonly known as Halfest is an annual five-day trade show first launched in 2011 to promote Malaysian's Small and Medium-sized Business that are certified to be Halal. In 2012, SimplySiti cosmetic range was placed second in the Best Packaging category of Halfest 2012 Awards.

Year	Nominee / work	Award	Result
2012	SimplySiti	Best Packaging	Second Place

=== Islamic Excellence Awards ===
The Islamic Excellence Awards 1441H/2020AD was organised by the National Dakwah Council. The awards to recognize the outstanding excellence of individuals and organisations in various fields including academic, corporate, business and social advocacy.

Year	Nominee / work	Award	Result
2020	SimplySiti	People's Choice Awards (Jabir Ibn Hayyan Emerging Brand of the Year)	Nominated

=== Kecantikan Untukumu Cosmopolitan Awards ===
Year	Nominee / work	Award	Result
2010	SimplySiti	The Best Water-Proof Mascara	Won

=== Brandlaureate - SME's Chapter Awards ===
On 11 January 2011, she received two awards from The BrandLaureate - Small and Medium Enterprises Chapter Awards (The BrandLaureate - SME's Chapter Awards), one for her SimplySiti range, for Most Promising Brand and another one for herself, first time introduced in 2011, The BrandLaureate Tun Dr. Siti Hasmah SME's Women of The Year 2010 which was presented by Siti Hasmah Mohamad Ali, wife of Malaysia's fourth Prime Minister, Mahathir Mohamad herself.

Year	Nominee / work	Award	Result
2011	SimplySiti	Most Promising Brand	Won
2011	Herself	The BrandLaureate Tun Dr. Siti Hasmah SME's Women of The Year	Won
2019	SimplySiti	The BrandLaureate World Halal Best Brands Award (Cosmetics & Skincare Solutions)	Won
2019	Herself	World Halal Brand Leadership Award	Won
2023	Herself	Women Entrepreneur of the Year (Celebrity Beauty Entrepreneur)	Won

=== Malaysia Excellence Business Awards ===
Malaysia Excellence Business Awards (MEBA) organize by Asia Pacific Business Council for Sustainability and Malaysia Digital Chamber of Commerce (MDCC). This awards to recognise accomplishment of individuals and businesses for their sustainable contributions to the nation's economy and progress.

Year	Nominee / work	Award	Result
2019	Herself	Celebrity Woman Entrepreneur of the Year	Won

=== Malaysia's Strongest Brands Award ===
Malaysia's Strongest Brands Award was hosted by Y&R (Young and Rubicam) Malaysia, to recognize the strongest brands in Malaysia across 10 categories including Automative, Banking, Beauty, Food and Beverage, Insurance, Retail Industry and Telecommunications. The winners were chosen based on the BrandAsset Valuator (BAV) Malaysia Study 2016, which looked at merit and detailed data collection of over 900 brands in Malaysia.

Year	Nominee / work	Award	Result
2016	SimplySiti	Malaysia's Strongest Brands - BEAUTY	Won

=== Nona Top Beauty Entrepreneur Awards ===
Nona Top Beauty Entrepreneur Awards organized by Nona magazine is to appreciate and celebrate cosmetic businesswoman that had been successful and become motivate to other women.

Year	Nominee / work	Award	Result
2020	Herself	Nona Top Beauty Entrepreneur	Won

=== Shopee Seller Awards ===
Shopee one of the leading e-commerce platform in Southeast Asia and Taiwan hosted the Shopee Seller Awards where they honor their expanding community of sellers in the Shopee platform.

Year	Nominee / work	Award	Result
2018	Herself	People's Celebrity Award	Won

=== UDC Business Awards ===
On 8 October 2011, she received an award by UDC Business Awards (Universo De Comercio Business Awards) under the category of "UDC Best Upcoming Cosmetic Product" presented by former Prime Minister, Tun Mahathir.

Year	Nominee / work	Award	Result
2011	SimplySiti	UDC Best Upcoming Cosmetic Product	Won

=== Watson's Health, Wellness and Beauty Awards ===
Year	Nominee / work	Award	Result
2010	SimplySiti	The Best Halal Launch	Won
2010	SimplySiti	The Best Halal BB-Cream	Won
2010	SimplySiti	The Best Coverage Face Powder	Won
2010	SimplySiti	The Best Exclusive Brand Launch	Won
2011	SimplySiti	Best Halal BB-Cream	Won
2011	SimplySiti	Best Coverage Face Powder	Won
2012	SimplySiti	Best Multi Function Cream	Won
2012	SimplySiti	Best New Eau De Parfum	Won
2012	SimplySiti	Best Celebrity Brand	Won
2013	SimplySiti	Best 2way Powder	Won
2013	SimplySiti	Best Eau De Parfum	Won
2013	SimplySiti	Best Multi Function Cream	Won
2013	Herself	Best Entrepreneur of the Year Award 2013	Won
2014	SimplySiti	Best Fragrance	Won
2014	SimplySiti	Best Moisturizer Range	Won
2014	SimplySiti	Best Experience Differentiation Brand	Won
2015	SimplySiti	Best CSR Campaign	Won
2016	SimplySiti	Best CSR Campaign	Won
2018	SimplySiti - Elegant 2 Way Cake Powder 1's (Asst)	Most Wanted - Skin Perfecting Face Range	Won
2018	SimplySiti - Dermagic Beauty Moisturiser	Most Wanted - Beauty Moisturiser	Won
2019	SimplySiti	Best CSR Campaign	Won
2019	SimplySiti - Elegant Two Way Cake Powder 1's (Asst)	Most Wanted - Skin Perfecting Face Range	Won
2019	SimplySiti - Dermagic Beauty Moisturiser	Most Wanted - Beauty Moisturiser	Won
2021	SimplySiti - Simply Elegant 2 Way Cake ASST	Most Wanted - Skin Perfecting Face Range	Won
2021	SimplySiti - Simply Elegent Loose Powder	Most Wanted - Loose Powder	Won
2021	SimplySiti - Argan Wonder Foundation ASST	Most Wanted - Skin Perfecting Face Range	Won
2021	SimplySiti - Argan Wonder Powder ASST	Most Wanted - Skin Perfecting Face Range	Won
2023	SimplySiti - Two Way Cake (Asst)	Most Wanted - 2Way Cake Powder	Won
2023	SimplySiti - Compact Powder (Asst)	Most Wanted - Compact Powder	Won
2023	SimplySiti - Rosehip Beauty Moisturizer 30ml	Most Wanted - Beauty Moisturiser	Won
2024	SimplySiti	Watsons Partnership Recognition Award	Won
2024	SimplySiti - Timeless Two Way Cake (Asst)	Most Wanted - Two Way Cake	Won
2024	SimplySiti - Fresh Colour Matte Lipstick (Asst)	Most Wanted - Pigmented Lipstick	Won
2024	SimplySiti - Dermagic Max Triple Repair Moisturiser 30ml	Most Wanted - Beauty Moisturiser	Won
2025	SimplySiti – Argan Wonder Foundation	Most Wanted Argan Foundation	Won
2025	SimplySiti – Timeless Cushion Foundation	Most Wanted Timeless Cushion Foundation	Won
2025	SimplySiti – Fresh Colour Matte Lipstick	Most Wanted Pigmented Lipstick	Won
2025	SimplySiti – Dermagic Max Triple Repair Moisturiser	Most Wanted Repair Moisturiser	Won

== Miscellaneous ==
=== Accolades from media ===
==== Magazines ====
===== Anugerah Cosmopolitan Fun Fearless Fabulous (Cosmopolitan Fun Fearless Fabulous Awards) =====
Year	Nominee / work	Award	Result
2011		Best Female Celebrity	Won

===== Anugerah InTrend 10 Tahun (InTrend Awards) =====
Year	Nominee / work	Award	Result
2015	Herself	Anugerah Sampul Majalah Paling Popular (Most Popular Magazine Cover Awards)	Won

===== Anugerah InTrend Gala 2017 (InTrend Awards) =====
Anugerah InTrend Gala 2017 is an awards ceremony that was held to celebrate the 12th anniversary of Malaysian magazine InTrend. Over the past 12 years, InTrend magazine presents a variety of interesting information related to fashion, beauty, lifestyle and celebrities all around the world.

Year	Nominee / work	Award	Result
2017	Herself	Suri Teladan Inspirasi	Nominated

===== Anugerah Majalah Wanita (Wanita Magazine Awards) =====
Year	Nominee / work	Award	Result
1999		Best Cover	Won

===== Anugerah Mangga (Mangga Awards) =====
Year	Nominee / work	Award	Result
1999		Mangga Sensational Postcard Competition	First Place

===== Anugerah Nona Superwoman (Nona Superwoman Awards) =====
Nona Superwoman Award which carry the theme "Inspirasi Wanita Bermula Di Sini" (Women's Inspiration Begins Here), is an award organised to recognise women in various categories by the Nona magazine.

Year	Nominee / work	Award	Result
2018	Herself	Nona Influencer Award	Won
2018	Herself	Nona Legend Award	Won
2020	Herself	Nona Homegrown Award	Won
2022	Herself	Nona Celebrity Business Award	Won

===== Anugerah Pilihan Pembaca Manja (Manja's Readers' Choice Awards) =====
Year	Nominee / work	Award	Result
2003		Best Cover	Won
2003		Best Artiste (Female)	Won
2003		Best Global Artiste	Won

===== Anugerah Stail Eh! (Eh!'s Style Awards) =====
Year	Nominee / work	Award	Result
2010		Celebrity with the Best Achievements	Won
2010		Role Model Celebrity	Won
2012		Best Celebrity Magazine Cover	Nominated
2012		Celebrity with the Best Achievements	Won
2014	Herself	Most Photogenic Celebrity	Nominated
2014	Herself	Celebrity Magazine Cover Choice	Won
2016	Herself	Celebrity Magazine Cover Choice	Won
2017	Herself	Celebrity with the Best Achievement	Nominated
2019	Herself	Celebrity Magazine Cover Choice	Nominated

===== Anugerah URS (URS Awards) =====
Year	Nominee / work	Award	Result
2001	"Kau Kekasihku"	Favourite Choice for Ballad Song	Won
2001		Favourite Choice for Teen Artiste	Won
2001		Favourite Choice for Model	Won
2004		Most Glamorous Teen Star	Won
2004		Most Glamorous Female Artiste	Won
2004		Most Glamorous and Popular Artiste	Won

==== Radio Stations ====
===== Anugerah Pilihan Hits Pendengar Radio Malaysia Kuala Lumpur dan Radio Muzik (Radio Malaysia Kuala Lumpur and Radio Muzik Listeners' Hits Choice Award) =====
First held in 2002, Anugerah Pilihan Hits Pendengar Radio Malaysia Kuala Lumpur dan Radio Muzik is an award ceremony of the collaboration of two radio stations - Radio Malaysia Kuala Lumpur and Radio Muzik where finalists were shortlisted based on their popularity on both stations.

Year	Nominee / work	Award	Result
2002	"Bicara Manis Menghiris Kalbu"	Best Performance	Won
2002	"Bicara Manis Menghiris Kalbu"	Listeners' Hits Choice	Nominated

===== Anugerah Radio24 BERNAMA (BERNAMA Radio24 Awards) =====
To celebrate their fifth anniversary, one of BERNAMA's radio stations, Radio24 presented five special awards for five special categories (Media Icon, Sports Icon, Governmental Agency/Department Icon, National Institution Icon and Entertainment Icon).

Year	Nominee / work	Award	Result
2012		Entertainment Icon	Won

===== Carta Radio 3 Shah Alam (Shah Alam's Radio 3 Chart) =====
The songs chosen for this competition were chosen by fans where 30 songs competed in three main categories and three professional judges will evaluate 10 songs for each category - solo performance, group performance and dangdut songs. Two songs of her compete in this competition, Aku Cinta Padamu and Cindai where Aku Cinta Padamu won Best Performance (Solo) and also as the runner-up for an additional category, Carta Pujaan (Most Demanded Song Chart).

Year	Nominee / work	Award	Result
1998	"Aku Cinta Padamu"	Best Performance (Solo)	Won
1998	"Aku Cinta Padamu"	Most Demanded Song Chart	Second Place
1998	"Cindai"	Best Performance (Solo)	Nominated

===== ERA Corner =====
Year	Nominee / work	Award	Result
2000			Second Place

===== ERA Digital Music Awards =====
ERA Digital Music Awards is an award ceremony hosted by Malaysia's radio company, Era FM annually and first organized in 2016. The awards recognized the talent of local artists using social media and digital mediums to step in the entertainment world and develop their talents.

Year	Nominee / work	Award	Result
2018	Anta Permana	Lagu Paling Viral (Most Viral Song)	Nominated
2018	Herself	Anugerah Khas (Special Award)	Won

===== Radio Era.fm =====
Year	Nominee / work	Award	Result
2015	Herself	Most Singles Played on Radio (Lagu Paling Banyak Dimainkan)	Won
2015	Herself	Era Best Artiste September 2015 (Artis Terbaik Era September 2015)	Won
2018	Herself	Sis Lit ERA November 2018	Won

===== Top Hot Awards =====
Top Hot is an award ceremony that made its début in 2017. It was organized by Malaysia's radio station, Hot.fm to recognize the hottest song and highlighted the singer's artistic talent through their popular songs. It is a voting-based awards, where fans are free to vote for their favourites through the awards' official website.

Year	Nominee / work	Award	Result
2017	Herself	Penyanyi Wanita Hot (Hot Female Singer)	Nominated
2017	Segala Perasaan	Lagu Hot (Hot Song)	No. 7
2018	Anta Permana	Lagu Hot (Hot Song)	No. 1

===== Volunteer Malaysia Awards =====
Volunteer Malaysia Awards is an award ceremony that made its debut in 2014. The event was organized by Malaysia's radio station, iM4U fm to recognise and nurture the spirit of volunteerism and social activism through various activities.

Year	Nominee / work	Award	Result
2016	Yayasan Nurjiwa (Ops Murni 2015) – Datuk Siti Nurhaliza & Dato’ Sri Khalid Mohamad Jiwa	Personality	Nominated

==== TV Program ====
===== Anugerah Meletop ERA =====
Anugerah Meletop ERA is an award ceremony that made its début in 2014. It is a collaboration between MeleTOP television programme and Era FM radio station to recognise local Malaysian celebrities "in various platforms including music, radio, television, film, and digital." It is a voting-based awards, where fans are free to vote for their favourites through the awards' official website and short message service (SMS).

Year	Nominee / work	Award	Result
2014	Herself	Penyanyi Meletop (Most 'Happening' Singer)	Nominated
2014	Herself	Bintang Siber Meletop (Most 'Happening' Cyber Star)	Nominated
2014	Herself	Group/Duo Meletop (Most 'Happening' Group/Duo)^{A}	Won
2014	"Galau"	Lagu Meletop (Most 'Happening' Song)	Nominated
2014	"Muara Hati"^{A}	Lagu Meletop (Most 'Happening' Song)	Nominated
2015	Herself	Bintang Online Meletop (Most 'Happening' Online Star)	Won
2015	"Jaga Dia Untukku"	Penyanyi Meletop (Most 'Happening' Singer)	Won
2015	"Jaga Dia Untukku"	Lagu Meletop (Most 'Happening' Song)	Nominated
2016	Herself	Penyanyi Meletop (Most 'Happening' Singer)	Nominated
2016	Herself	Bintang Online Meletop (Most 'Happening' Online Star)	Won
2016	Herself	Group/Duo Meletop (Most 'Happening' Group/Duo)^{B}	Nominated
2016	"Terbaik Bagimu"	Lagu Meletop (Most 'Happening' Song)	Nominated
2017	Herself	Penyanyi Meletop (Most 'Happening' Singer)	Nominated
2017	Herself	Bintang Online Meletop (Most 'Happening' Online Star)	Nominated
2017	"Dirgahayu"	Group/Duo Meletop (Most 'Happening' Group/Duo)^{C}	Won
2017	"Super Spontan All Star (episod Datuk Siti Nurhaliza)"	Program Meletop (Most 'Happening' Program)	Nominated
2018	"Dirgahayu"	Group/Duo Meletop (Most 'Happening' Group/Duo)^{C}	Won
2018	"Dirgahayu"	Lagu Meletop (Most 'Happening' Song)^{C}	Nominated
2019	"Anta Permana"	Lagu Meletop (Most 'Happening' Song)	Nominated
2019	Herself	Penyanyi Meletop (Most 'Happening' Singer)	Nominated

- ^{A} She shared the nomination with Hafiz Suip.
- ^{B} She shared the nomination with Cakra Khan.
- ^{C} She shared the nomination with Faizal Tahir.

===== Anugerah Melodi =====
Anugerah Melodi (Melodi Awards) is a special award ceremony that was held in conjunction with Melodi Raya 2013 (special TV show of Melodi for Eid-ul-Fitr).

Year	Recipient	Award	Result
2013	Herself	Female Artist Choice Award	Won

===== Anugerah Parti Cit Cat Azwan (Azwan's Chit Chat Party Awards) =====
Year	Nominee / work	Award	Result
2002		Best Role Model Artiste	Won
2002		Most Popular Artiste	Won

===== Anugerah Parti HIP TV (HIP TV Party Awards) =====
It was first organised in 2010 by TV9 for celebrating artistes in non-conventional categories where it received positive and negative feedback from the people in the entertainment industry, where winners were voted by viewers through SMS. In its inaugural event, Siti won one award from one nomination received out of 10 categories available.

Year	Nominee / work	Award	Result
2010		Best Role Model	Won

===== Bella Awards =====
In 2013, at the inaugural award competition, she beat nine other contenders in the category of "Bella On-Stage Award" based on the votes by fans via SMS and online voting. This is the first ever all-women award ceremony in Malaysia which was held in conjunction of International Women's Day to "celebrate, honour, and recognise the contributions of women in the country".

Year	Nominee / work	Award	Result
2013		On-Stage Award	Won

===== Breakfast With The Stars =====
In 2006, she was picked as the Best Dressed Artiste in an event by Astro and STAR Movies, Breakfast With The Stars which is in conjunction with the 78th Academy Awards where she won a ticket for two to watch the 49th Grammy Awards.

Year	Nominee / work	Award	Result
2006		Best Dressed Artiste	Won

===== NEF-Awani ICT Awards =====
NEF-Awani ICT Awards is an award-giving ceremony that was introduced to give recognitions to companies via an integrated media platform. There are two main sections of the awards, which are ICT Awards (by juries) and People's Choice Awards (by voting). In 2013, Siti won the only category that is opened for local celebrities and artistes' - Favourite Local Celebrity@ICT.

Year	Recipient	Award	Result
2013	Herself	Favourite Local Celebrity@ICT	Won

==== TV shows ====
===== Anugerah Seri Angkasa (Seri Angkasa Awards) =====
An award for television and radio in Malaysia, that was initially triggered by the Ministry of Information Malaysia in 1972. In early involvement, the awards only for publishing radio programs and publications of Televisyen Radio Malaysia. However starting in 2004, the ministry has opened up opportunities to others host broadcasters to participate.

Year	Recipient	Award	Result
1999	Herself	Best TV Entertainer	Nominated
2001	Herself	Best TV Entertainer	Nominated
2004	Aidilfitri Bersama Siti Nurhaliza, Astro	Best TV Musical Special	Won

===== Anugerah Skrin =====
An annual event that was launched in 1995 which was organised by TV3. The awards to recognised the best Malaysia's television program, film, actors, personalities and productions. In early involvement, the awards only for publishing television programs and publications of TV3. However starting in 2006, TV3 has opened up opportunities to others host broadcasters to participate.

Year	Recipient	Award	Result
2011	Stylistika Siti	Best TV Entertainment Programme	Nominated

==== Malam Throwbaek Drama ====
Malam Throwbaek Drama (Throwbaek Drama Night) made its debut in 2017. It was organised by H!Live (television programme) and Astro (TV station) to give appreciation to those involved and committed into the success of Astro's drama. There are about eleven categories, eight categories are based on 50% online votes and 50% of Astro's juries.

Year	Recipient	Award	Result
2017	"OST Lara Aishah - Dirgahayu" feat Faizal Tahir	OST Paling Throwbaek	Nominated

=== Accolades from organisations ===
==== Anugerah Persatuan Perlindungan Hak Cipta Karyawan Muzik (Music Authors Copyright Protection Awards) ====
Anugerah Persatuan Perlindungan Hak Cipta Karyawan Muzik, or commonly known as MACP, is an event that was first launched in 1996, to recognise the best lyricists and music composers based on their royalty collections and acknowledging their contributions to the music industry. The royalty collections are based on the amount received from airing or broadcasting songs made by them through radio airwaves, television shows and even public performances.

Year	Nominee / work	Award	Result
2002	"Pandang-Pandang Jeling-Jeling"duet with Tan Sri S.M. Salim	Most Performed Malay Song	Won
2004		Potential Young Lyricist	Won
2007	"Cindai"	Top 90's Favourite	Won
2007	"Pandang-Pandang Jeling-Jeling"duet with Tan Sri S.M. Salim	Latest Popular Choice	Nominated
2008	"Hati"	Best Song	Nominated
2008	"Hati"	Best Musical Arrangement	Won
2009	"Aku Cinta Padamu"	Most Performed Malay Song	Won

==== Anugerah RIM (RIM's Awards) ====
Year	Nominee / work	Award	Result
1998	Adiwarna	Best Achievement for Malay Album	Won

==== Anugerah Festival Filem Malaysia (Malaysian Film Festival Awards) ====
In 2008, her song that was used as a theme song for film, 1957: Hati Malaya won the award for the category of Lagu Tema Asal Terbaik (Best Original Theme Song) from Anugerah Festival Filem Malaysia ke-21 (21st Malaysian Film Festival) where this song was included in her twelfth album, Hadiah Daripada Hati.

Year	Nominee / work	Award	Result
2008	"Hati"	Best Original Theme Song	Won

==== Anugerah Oskar ====
Not to be confused with Oscars of the Academy Awards, Anugerah Oskar is a Malaysian award that recognises the technical aspects of a film.

Year	Recipient	Award	Result
2008	"Hati"	Melodies Film 2008 Jury Choice	Won

==== JOOX Malaysia Top Music Awards ====
JOOX Malaysia Top Music Awards (Mid Year 2020) organized by JOOX Malaysia for the first time is part of the High5JOOX campaign party for JOOX's 5th anniversary in Malaysia. All winner in each categories were choose based on fan voting. Later in January 2021, Joox announced the winners for 2020 JOOX Top Music Awards. The awards consist of 3 categories Most Popular Awards (Votes), Year End 2020 (streaming from July 1 to December 31, 2020) and Full Year 2020 (streaming counts from January 1 to December 31, 2020).

Year	Categories	Recipient	Award	Result
2020	Mid Year 2020	Herself	JOOX Paling Popular: Artis Lokal (Most Popular: Local Artist)	Won
2020	Mid Year 2020	Herself	JOOX Top 5 Artis: Lokal (Top 5 Artist: Local)	Won
2021	End Year 2020	Herself	JOOX Artis Paling Popular: Lokal (Most Popular Artist: Local)	Won
2021	End Year 2020	Herself	JOOX Top 5 Artis: Lokal (Top 5 Artist: Local)	Won
2021	End Year 2020	Aku Bidadari Syurgamu	JOOX Lagu Paling Popular: Lokal (Most Popular Song: Local)	Won
2021	End Year 2020	Aku Bidadari Syurgamu	JOOX Top 5 Hit: Lokal (Top 5 Hits: Local)	Won
2021	Full Year 2020	Herself	JOOX Top 5 Artis Tahun 2020: Lokal (Top 5 Artist of the Year: Local)	Won
2021	Full Year 2020	Aku Bidadari Syurgamu	JOOX Top 5 Hit Tahun 2020: Lokal (Top 5 Hits of the Year: Local)	Won
2021	Mid Year 2021	Herself	Top 5 Artis : Artis Lokal (Top 5 Artists: Local Artist)	Won
2021	Mid Year 2021	Herself	Top Pilihan Peminat (Top Fans Pick)	Nominated
2022	End Year 2021	Herself	JOOX Top 5 Artis: Lokal (Top 5 Artist: Local)	Won
2022	End Year 2021	Herself	JOOX Top Pilihan Peminat (TOP Fans Pick)	Nominated
2022	End Year 2021	Anta Permana	JOOX Top 3 Karaoke: Trending Hits	Nominated
2022	End Year 2021	Basyirah	JOOX Top 3 Karaoke: Trending Hits	Nominated

==== Universal Music Malaysia Awards ====
Legend Award trophy was presented to Siti Nurhaliza for her latest achievements in collaboration with Universal Music Malaysia for her successful album physical and digital sale for Fragmen (3× Platinum), Unplugged (Gold) and SimetriSiti (Gold); digital sale for single Anta Permana (11× Platinum), Comel Pipi Merah (4× Platinum), Cinta Syurga duet Khai Bahar (Gold) and Mikraj Cinta (4× Platinum); and being named the most streamed local artiste on Spotify for year 2017 and 2018. This award was presented by Kenny Ong, managing director of the Universal Music Group for Malaysia, Singapore and Indochina.

Year	Nominee / work	Award	Result
2019	Herself	Universal Music Legend Award	Won

==== Yonder Music ====
Yonder Music is a digital music service that can access millions of song to download and play. In conjunction with its 1st anniversary in Malaysia, Yonder Music had given an appreciation to Siti Nurhaliza.

Year	Nominee / work	Award	Result
2016	Herself	Hear Forever	Won

==== YouChoose Video Music Awards ====
First organized in 2017, YouChoose Video Music Awards is an award to acknowledge and honor the greatest music videos of the year and the winner were choose by the fans, where fans are free to vote their favourites through the awards' official website. These awards organized by Universal Music Malaysia a recording company.

Year	Nominee / work	Award	Result
2017	"Segala Perasaan"	Video Muzik Paling Jiwang	Won
2017	"Mikraj Cinta"	Video Musik Terbaik	Won
2017	"Mikraj Cinta"	Artist Terbaik 2017	Won

== Appointments and recognitions ==
=== Appointments ===
Government campaigns

- Ambassador of Budi Bahasa dan Nilai-Nilai Murni (2006)
- Ambassador of Gegar U! Warna Warna Malaysiaku (2007)
- Ambassador 'Living With Breast Cancer' (2011)
- Tourism Advisors Of Malaysia (2015)
- Entrepreneur's Iconic Vendeur Festival - Perbadanan Pembangunan Perdagangan Luar Malaysia (MATRADE) (2016)
- Celebrity Cycling Women Icon (Ikon Selebriti Kayuhan Wanita) - Dasar Komuniti Negara, Kementerian Perumahan dan Kerajaan Tempatan (2019)
- MUN Icon (Ikon Minggu Usahawan Nasional) - Kementeri Pembangunan Usahawan (2019)

Products

- Model/Spokesperson of Maybelline (1999–2003)
- Model of Mitsubishi Trium (2000)
- Model of and Pepsi and Pepsi Blue (2000–2002)
- Model of Nippon Wiper Blade(2001)
- Ambassador of TM Net (2002-2003)
- Ambassador of Minolta DiMAGE Malaysia (2003)
- Ambassador of Maxis-Hotlink (2004)
- Ambassador of IT Samsung Products Malaysia (2004)
- Ambassador of Elegance Tiara Collection (2006)
- Ambassador of Olay Total Effects (2006-2008)
- Ambassador of SHINE Pantene Pro-V (2006-2008)
- Ambassador of Pantene (2007)
- Ambassador/Spokesperson of Sity Avita Sdn. Bhd (2009)
- Ambassador of Ariani (Ikon Ariani) (2014)
- Ambassador of Yonder Music Malaysia (2015)
- Ambassador of Vivo V5, Vivo Malaysia (2016)
- Ambassador of VisionBody Malaysia (2017)
- Ambassador of CryoCord Malaysia (2018)
- Ambassador of Vantage (2018)
- Ambassador of Vivo V15 Pro, Vivo Malaysia (2019)
- Ambassador of Vivo V17 Pro, Vivo Malaysia (2019)
- Ambassador of Cuckoo (2020–Present)
- Ambassador of Farm Fresh (2022–Present)

University and organisations

- Ambassador of Goodwill Malaysian Red Crescent Society (1999–2001)
- Ambassador of First ASEAN ParaGames (2001)
- Ambassador of "With All Our Hearts’ Charity Fund" Jusco and Æon (2002–2009)
- Ambassador of National Anti-Drug Campaign (2006)
- Ambassador of Suara Universiti (2007)
- International Advisor of Performing Arts of Limkokwing University (2008)
- Ambassador of the Malaysian AIDS Foundation (2012–present)
- Board of Trustees of Yayasan PINTAR (2017)
- Board of Directors of Akademi Seni Dan Warisan (Aswara) (2018)
- Ambassador of Binary University (2022)

=== Recognitions and honours ===
Royal knighthood and titles

- Darjah Kebesaran Sultan Ahmad Shah Pahang Yang Amat Di Mulia - Peringkat Keempat Ahli Ahmad Shah Pahang (AAP) - by Sultan Ahmad Shah of Pahang (1999)
- Darjah Seri Paduka Mahkota Perak - Pangkat Ketiga - Paduka Mahkota Perak (PMP) - by Sultan Azlan Shah of Perak (2001)
- Darjah Yang Mulia Setia Mahkota - Darjah Pangkat Ketiga - Johan Setia Mahkota (JSM) - by Yang di-Pertuan Agong (at that time) Tuanku Syed Sirajuddin of Perlis (2003)
- Darjah Kebesaran Sultan Ahmad Shah Pahang Yang Amat Di Mulia - Peringkat Ketiga Setia Ahmad Shah Pahang (SAP) - by Sultan Ahmad Shah of Pahang (2005)
- Darjah Kebesaran Mahkota Pahang Yang Amat Mulia - Peringkat Kedua Darjah Indera Mahkota Pahang (DIMP) - by Sultan Ahmad Shah of Pahang (2006)
- Darjah Kebesaran Sultan Ahmad Shah Pahang Yang Amat Di Mulia - Peringkat Pertama Sri Sultan Ahmad Shah Pahang (SSAP) - by Tengku Abdullah Sultan Shah, Pemangku Raja Pahang (2017)

Government-based

- Malaysia's Stamp Princess by Pos Malaysia - For receiving tens of thousands of fan letters each year.
- Anugerah Pelabur Bijaksana (1999) - Permodalan Nasional Berhad (PNB)
- Anugerah Personaliti Terbaik (2000) - Papita (Persatuan Penyanyi-penyanyi Tanah Air (Local Singers Association))
- Anugerah Puteri Remaja (2002) - Puteri UMNO
- Anugerah Jasamu Dikenang MAYC (2003)
- Anugerah Bintang Seniman (2004) - Anugerah Perdana Bintang Seniman
- Anugerah Srikandi Seni (2005) - UMNO Bahagian Maran, Pahang
- Tokoh Karyawan Usahawan Muda (2005) - Universiti Sains Malaysia
- Anugerah Kesatria Puteri Kesenian (2012) - Puteri UMNO
- Pingat Jasa Bakti (PJB) (2016) - Lembaga Kesedaran Pencegahan Jenayah Malaysia
- Tourism Icon of The Year (Celebrity) (2018) - Malaysia Tourism Council Gold Awards
- Anugerah Khas Biduanita Negara - Anugerah Seni Negara 2024 (ASN 2024) - Malaysia Ministry of Tourism, Arts and Culture
- Majikan Pesona LINDUNG - Social Security Organisation (Pertubuhan Keselamatan Sosial (PERKESO))

Non Government-based

- The Most Successful Talent In Malaysia Music Industry - Stars of Universe of Corum (2002)
- The Outstanding Young Malaysian Award - Cultural Achievement - Junior Chamber International Malaysia (2003)
- Malaysian Personality of the Year Award - BestBrands Award (2005)
- Malaysia Professional Artiste Award - Anugerah Kecemerlangan Balai Ikhtisas Malaysia (2008)
- YOUTH'10 Icon - Malaysia's Youth Festival (2010)
- Anugerah Wanita Inspirasi (Inspirational Woman Award) - Anugerah Kasih Ikatan Setia Malaysia-Indonesia (2011)
- Anugerah 5tars (5star Award) - 5star-5 Designers under 4 differences labels (2012)
- Anugerah Kemanusiaan (Humanity Award) - Majlis Perundingan Islam Malaysia MAPIM (2013)
- Her World Young Achiever 2013 - HerWorld Women Awards (2014)
- National Icon - Inaugural Malaysia Women Of Excellence Awards (2014)
- Jewel of Muslim World - Jewels Of Muslim World Awards (2014)
- Asian Music Legend - Top Asia Corporate Ball (2014)
- Anugerah Srikandi Negara - Anugerah Tokoh Srikandi Negara, Gabungan Pelajar Melayu Semenanjung Malaysia GPMS (2014)
- Celebrity Entrepreneur Of The Year - SME & Entrepreneurship Business Award:Premier Edition 2017–2018 (2017)
- The 100 Most Influential Young Entrepreneurs (100MIYE) - Entrepreneur Insight (2018)
- The 100 Most Influential Young Entrepreneurs - Entrepreneur Insight (2019)
- Celebrity Entrepreneur Lifetime Achievement Award 2019 - The 13th Asian Academy of Management International Conference 2019 at Universiti Sains Malaysia (2019)
- Lifetime Achievement Noble Woman Award - ShangHai Honourable Women Entrepreneur Business Award (SHE) (2023)

The Malaysia Book of Records

- Most Awards Won Artiste - 53 awards (2001)
- Most Awards Won Artiste - 112 awards (2004)
- First Malaysian artiste to perform a solo concert at Royal Albert Hall (2005)
- Biggest Participation in Skin Transformation event in One Day – Given to her cosmetic company, SimplySiti (2013)
- Icon Of Malaysia Award (2014)

Other Recognitions/Honorifics

- "Voice of Asia"
- "Asia's Celine Dion"
- Second "Asia's Best Musical Artiste" by MTV Asia (2005)
- Second "Biggest Asian Artiste" by Channel V (2005)
- Top 20 "Celebrity Weddings" by Yahoo! Buzz (2006)
- She was named as one of Asia's Idol by Asia News Network (2008)
- Top 10 "Influential Celebrities in Malaysia: Stars with the X-factor Sizzle" by asiaonenews (2009)
- Third "Most Powerful Celebrity Couple in Asia", given to Siti and her husband by E! News Asia (2010)
- Top of the pops by Southeast Asia Globe (2010)
- Top 5 "Asia's Most High-Profile Weddings" by CNBC (2011)
- No. 7 Malaysia's Top 10 Malay Tracks on Spotify 2014 for song 'Jaga Dia Untukku' (2014)
- The Muslim 500 - The World's 500 Most Influential Muslims 2016 (2015)
- Top five: Pop-tastic songbirds by Southeast Asia Globe (2015)
- Spotify's Top 5 Top Asian Artists in Malaysia (2015)
- Top 3 "Malaysia's Most Admired Women" by YouGov Asia-Pacific (2016)
- The Muslim 500 - The World's 500 Most Influential Muslims 2017 (2016)
- The Muslim 500 - The World's 500 Most Influential Muslims 2018 (2017)
- No. 1 Spotify's Most Streamed Local Artiste of The Year (2017)
- No. 1 (Women) World's Most Admired – Malaysia by YouGov UK (2018)
- No. 1 Top Local Female Artists - Spotify's 5 Years in Malaysia (2018)
- The 10th Anniversary Edition, The Muslim 500 - The World's 500 Most Influential Muslims 2019 (2018)
- No. 1 Spotify's Most Streamed Local Artiste of The Year (2018)
- Artiste of the Month-December, 2018 - Hitz Minggu Ini by RIA897.FM Singapore Radio Network (2018)
- No. 1 (Women) World's Most Admired – Malaysia by YouGov UK (2019)
- The Muslim 500 - The World's 500 Most Influential Muslims 2020 (2019)
- Top 3 Spotify's Most Streamed Local Artiste of The Year (2019)
- No. 2 Suria's Most Viewed Social Media Videos of 2019 - Mediacorp Suria-Singapore (2019)
- Top 3 Most Streamed Female Artists - JOOX Malaysia (2019)
- No. 1 at Top 30 Local Artists - JOOX Malaysia (2019)
- No. 1 (Women) World's Most Admired – Malaysia by YouGov UK (2020)
- No. 1 Spotify's Most Streamed Local Artiste of The Year (2020)
- The Muslim 500 - The World's 500 Most Influential Muslims 2021 (2020)
- Forbes Asia's 100 Digital Stars - Asia-Pacific's Most Influential Celebrities on Social Media by Forbes Asia (2020)
- No. 1 at JOOX 2020: Top 30 Artis Lokal (Top 30 Local Artists) - JOOX Malaysia (2020)
- No. 13 Aku Bidadari Syurgamu at JOOX 2020: Top 50 Lagu Lokal (Top 50 Local Songs) - JOOX Malaysia (2020)
- No. 43 Kesilapanku Keegoanmu at JOOX 2020: Top 100 Lagu Karaoke (Top 100 Karaoke Songs) - JOOX Malaysia (2020)
- No. 60 Anta Permana at JOOX 2020: Top 100 Lagu Karaoke (Top 100 Karaoke Songs) - JOOX Malaysia (2020)
- No. 95 Bukan Cinta Biasa at JOOX 2020: Top 100 Lagu Karaoke (Top 100 Karaoke Songs) - JOOX Malaysia (2020)
- No. 97 Jerat Percintaan at JOOX 2020: Top 100 Lagu Karaoke (Top 100 Karaoke Songs) - JOOX Malaysia (2020)
- No. 100 Kisah Kuinginkan at JOOX 2020: Top 100 Lagu Karaoke (Top 100 Karaoke Songs) - JOOX Malaysia (2020)
- N0. 1 Choice Successful Artist #Gempak TOP2020 (Artis Sukses 2020 Pilihan #Gempak TOP2020) - #Gempak (2020)
- N0. 5 Aku Bidadari Syurgamua - Choice Song #Gempak TOP2020 (Lagu Pilihan #Gempak TOP2020) - #Gempak (2020)
- No. 3 Personalities Most Prominent Throughout 2020 (Personaliti Paling Menyerlah Sepanjang 2020) listed by Astro AWANI (2020)
- Walk Of Fame - 2019 Walk Of Fame Stars
- Artis Tergempak - GEMPAK Most Wanted 2020
- Artiste Of The Year - Muzik Kita (2020)
- Celebrity Entrepreneur Of The Year (Beauty & Health) - 2021
- Passionate Icon Of The Year - Des Prix Infinitus Media Leadership Excellence Awards 2020–2021
- Asia's Most Influential - Tatler Asia
- Entrepreneurs Of The Year - SEBA
- Able Award 2021

== Footnotes ==
- Note 1: From those outlined inside the infobox only.
