= Gilbert Betjemann Prize =

Prize for operatic singing

The Gilbert Betjemann Prize (originally the Gilbert R. Betjemann Prize, also referred to as the Gilbert Betjemann Medal) is a gold medal awarded by the Royal Academy of Music (RA) "for operatic singing".

The award was founded in 1897 by G.H. Betjemann HonRA, to commemorate his son Gilbert Richard Betjemann, who was an associate and former student of the Academy and who had died following the collapse of a snow bridge over which he was walking near Grindelwald in the Bernese Alps on 9 September 1896.

In 1948 it was described as:

A Gold Medal of the value of £9.10s 0d is competed for annually in Midsummer Term by Male and Female Students who, having obtained a Silver Medal, give the best rendering of an Operatic Scena or other Dramatic or Operatic Solo. When deemed desirable, it is in the discretion of the Committee of Management to limit the Competition to Members of the Operatic Class.

In 2013, the great-nephew of the 1909 recipient, Margaret Ismay, showed her medal on an episode of the BBC's Antiques Roadshow. She had had it converted into a coin watch by Cartier.

The Gilbert Betjemann Memorial Prize is a registered charity in England and Wales with number 310007.

== Recipients ==
The first 49 recipients are listed on a wooden prize board, with gold lettering, in the collection of the Academy. They were:

- 1897: Isabel E. Jay
- 1898: R. Whitworth Milton
- 1899: Ethel Wood
- 1900: Ernest Torrence
- 1901: Edward F. Barrow
- 1902: Edith C. Patching
- 1903: W. Daniel Richards
- 1904: Ida Kahn
- 1905: Edith Henrietta Coish
- 1906: David Evans
- 1907: Cecil Pearson
- 1908: Mary Fielding
- 1909: Margaret Ismay
- 1910: William J. Samuell
- 1911: Olive Turner
- 1912: Lily M. Fairney
- 1914: Eleanor Evans
- 1915: Katharine Dyer
- 1916: William A. Michael
- 1917: Marjorie A. Perkins
- 1918: Bessie Kerr
- 1919: Leonard F. Hubbard
- 1920: Gladys Rolfe
- 1921: Ella R. Frank
- 1923: Garda Hall
- 1924: Roy Henderson
- 1925: Vera Kneebone
- 1926: Arthur Fear
- 1927: Bruce Anderson
- 1928: Lesley Duff
- 1929: Freda Townson
- 1930: Edgar Elmes
- 1931: Grace Reynolds
- 1932: Gwendolene Embley
- 1933: Gordon Macdonald
- 1934: Janet Hamilton-Smith
- 1935: Harold Child
- 1936: Megan Pentrhon-Jones
- 1937: E. Muriel Hill
- 1938: Roderick Jones
- 1939: Scott Joynt
- 1940: Joan Taylor
- 1941: Clement Hardman
- 1942: Estelle Applin
- 1943: Constance Shacklock
- 1944: Ethel Lyon
- 1945: Diana Vernon
- 1946: Jennifer Vyvyan
- 1947: Marjorie Davies
