= Margaret Ismay =

British opera singer

- Education: Royal Academy of Music
- Occupation: Opera singer
- Years active: fl. 1910–
- Awards: Gilbert Betjemann Prize

Margaret Ismay was a British opera singer. While a student at the Royal Academy of Music, she was awarded the Academy's Gilbert Betjemann Prize "for operatic singing" in 1909. She later had the medal converted into a coin watch by Cartier.

Ismay appeared in The Balkan Princess in 1910.

In 2013 her great-nephew showed the medal on an episode of the BBC's Antiques Roadshow.
