= Ella R. Frank =

British opera singer

Ella Rosetta Frank (9 June 1900 – 13 December 1988) was a British contralto and mezzo-soprano opera singer.

== Early life and education ==
Frank was born in Paddington, London. She had a twin brother, Murray Arthur Frank. She trained at the Royal Academy of Music where she won the Gilbert Betjemann Prize.

== Opera career ==
Frank further trained in France under Marguerite Hasselmans, the mistress of Gabriel Fauré, in 1924, and the Canadian soprano Pauline Donalda in 1925, and was engaged at the Théâtre municipal de Nantes and the Opéra de Lille where she was an artist in residence as a mezzo-soprano. Le Figaro in 1924 reported her contralto voice as being of rare beauty and that she interpreted Saint-Saëns and Fauré remarkably. The same newspaper in 1926 reported that, while at the Opéra de Lille, Frank won applause for her magnificent voice and her moving style.

== Personal life ==
Frank married flight pioneer Lawrence Arthur Wingfield in 1928. They later divorced and she married William Howie Wylie, nephew of Rev. William Howie Wylie, in 1947. She died in 1988 in London.
