= Dollar watch =

Inexpensive pocket watch developed in the late 19th- to early 20th-century

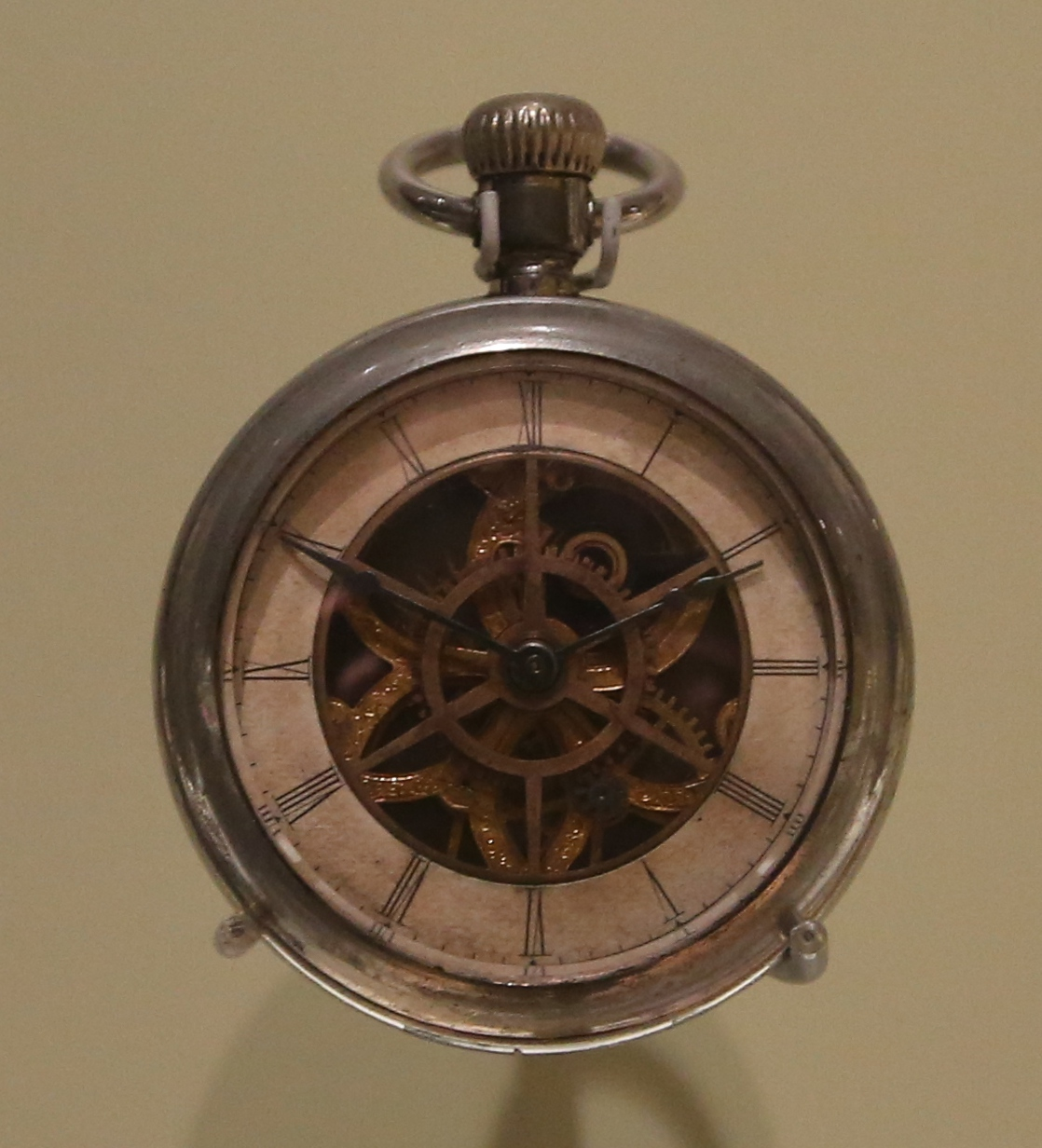
A Waterbury dollar watch

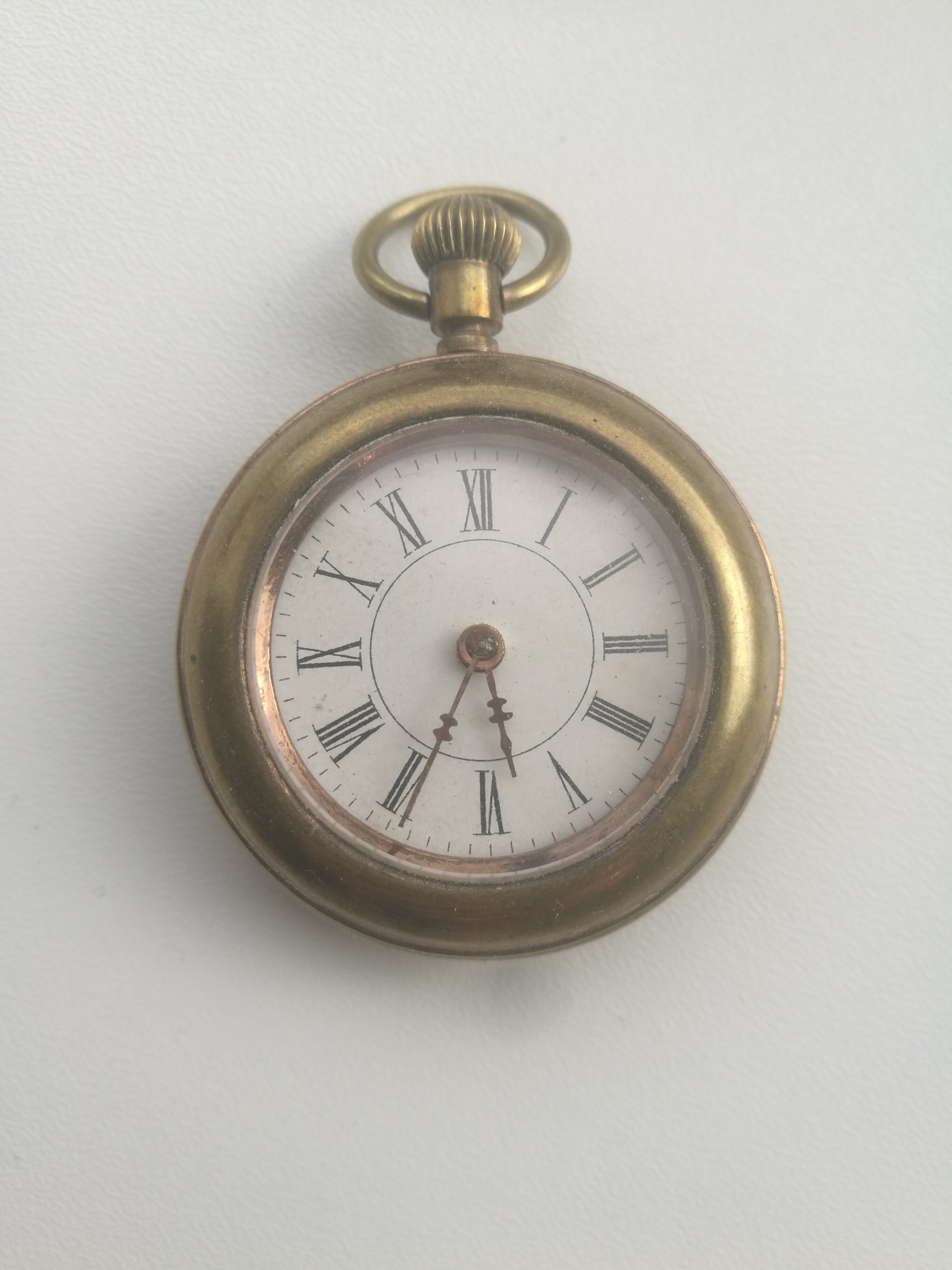
A dollar watch featuring a replacement crystal and dial; the dial, like most all dollar watches, is paper.

A dollar watch was a pocket watch or later, a wristwatch, that sold for about one US dollar.

== History of development ==
Attempts to make a watch that could be sold for as little as a dollar began in the 1870s. By 1880, the Waterbury Watch Company, not to be confused with the Waterbury Clock Company, had lowered costs to the point where they could sell their so-called long wind watch for $3.50. In the early 1890s the Ingersoll Watch Company started selling a Waterbury Clock Company clock in a watch case for $1.50.

The one dollar price was reached in 1896 when Ingersoll introduced a watch called the Yankee, setting its price at $1. This made it the cheapest watch available at the time, and the first watch to be priced at one dollar.

Later, Western Clock (Westclox) in 1899 and the E. Ingraham Company also began manufacturing them. Dollar watches were practical, mass-produced timepieces intended to be as inexpensive as possible.

Features of dollar watches were their simple, rugged design, movement (usually with a pin-pallet escapement, although sometimes with duplex escapements) which has either no jewels or just one jewel, width of about eighteen size (2 inches (51 mm)), and sale price of about a dollar from 1892 until the mid-1950s. Many other companies made them, with literally hundreds of names on the dials. From around 1905, Ingersoll started selling their watches in the UK as Crown watches.

To keep costs down, the watches were often sold in flimsy cardboard boxes, which are now highly collectible.

== See also ==
- List of watch manufacturers
- Coin watch
- Counterfeit watch
- Mystery watch
