= Lawrence Arthur Wingfield =

Lawrence Arthur Wingfield MC DFC (17 April 1898 – 23 October 1989) was an officer in the British Royal Flying Corps (RFC) and later the Royal Air Force (RAF), serving during World War I. He was a recipient of both the Military Cross (MC) and the Distinguished Flying Cross (DFC). He later became a solicitor and founder of the Guild of Air Pilots and Air Navigators (now the Honourable Company of Air Pilots).

== Early life and education ==
Wingfield was born in 1898 in Richmond, Surrey. He received his education at Aldenham School, near Elstree, Hertfordshire.

== Military career ==
Wingfield served in the Royal Flying Corps (RFC) and the Royal Air Force (RAF) during World War I, from 1910 to 1919, as a Flying Officer. His bravery in the war earned him the Military Cross and the Distinguished Flying Cross. He was captured by German forces after his aircraft was shot down and held as a prisoner of war from July 1st, 1916, to October 4th, 1917. Wingfield made a daring escape from the Strohen Camp in Hanover and crossed into Holland on October 11th, 1917.

=== Guild of Air Pilots and Air Navigators ===
Wingfield helped organise the foundation of the Guild of Air Pilots and Air Navigators, now known as the Honourable Company of Air Pilots, which was established in 1929 and became a Livery Company in 1956, and served as its first Clerk.

=== World War II and MI9 ===
During World War II, Wingfield contributed to MI9, a department of the War Office, where he assembled a file of escape narratives and related documents. This work drew upon his own experiences as a prisoner of war and his subsequent escape.

== Political and social involvement ==
Wingfield joined the Labour Party in 1923, was elected to the St. Marylebone Borough Council in 1925, and served on the Electricity and Finance Committees. He was a member of the Council of the Institution of Aeronautical Engineers, the Royal Aeronautical Society, the London Domestic Mission, and the Fabian Society of the L.L.P. In the 1929 general election he stood as Labour candidate for the Banbury constituency, coming third with 16.3% of the vote.

== Personal life ==
Wingfield was a member of the Royal Aero Club, the Belsize Boxing Club, the Inns of Court Fencing Club, and the "Done our Bit" Ex-Servicemen's Club.

Wingfield married opera singer Ella Frank in 1928.

He died in 1989 in St Peter's Hospital in Chertsey, Surrey.
