= Trium Mondo =

Touchscreen mobile phone model

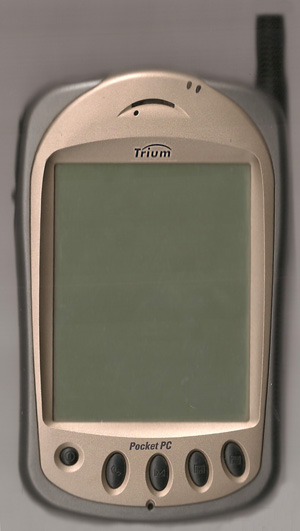
- Availability by region: August 2001; 25 years ago
- Compatible networks: GSM 900 1800
- Dimensions: 140 mm (5.5 in) H 84 mm (3.3 in) W 19 mm (0.75 in) D
- Weight: 200 g (7 oz)
- Operating system: Pocket PC 2000
- CPU: 166 MHz Intel SA-1110 CPU
- Display: 240x320, 16 colors (monochrome)
- Connectivity: IrDA

The Trium Mondo is an early touchscreen smartphone designed and marketed by Trium, a Mitsubishi subsidiary, which runs the Windows Pocket PC 2000 operating system.

The product was originally announced on January 10, 2000, at the Centre Georges Pompidou, Paris, and was released in the UK in August 2001. It featured dual-band GSM cellular connectivity, and was amongst the first devices released with GPRS support for data transfer.

== Screen and input ==
The touchscreen on the Mondo is a 9.9 cm (3.9 in) passive-matrix monochrome liquid crystal display. The resistive touchscreen has a resolution of 240 x 320 pixels in 16 shades of monochrome.

There are five physical buttons on the front of the Mondo, located under the display to toggle standby, and to provide shortcuts to the phone, messages, calendar and contacts features. A jog wheel on the left spine of the phone controls volume and another button starts and stops audio recordings.

The design omits a physical keypad, instead providing a virtual keypad operated using the touchscreen while in the phone application, and a virtual keyboard where applicable in other applications.

== Critical reception ==
Ilaria Santi writing in ZDNet concluded that the Trium Mondo is a "well-featured handheld/mobile phone" and that the price at launch was not unreasonable for the type of device. The Register believed that the compromises in the phone and PDA functionality in order to combine them was an issue, and suggested that it was "hard to see anyone replacing a PDA and a cellphone with a Mondo". In the New Straits Times, Matthew Mok highlighted the ease of having the PDA and phone features combined in one product over connecting two standalone devices but noted the lack of expansion slots compared to normal PDAs and the omission of a colour screen.
