= Corum (watchmakers) =

Swiss watchmaker

Corum 1955 SA

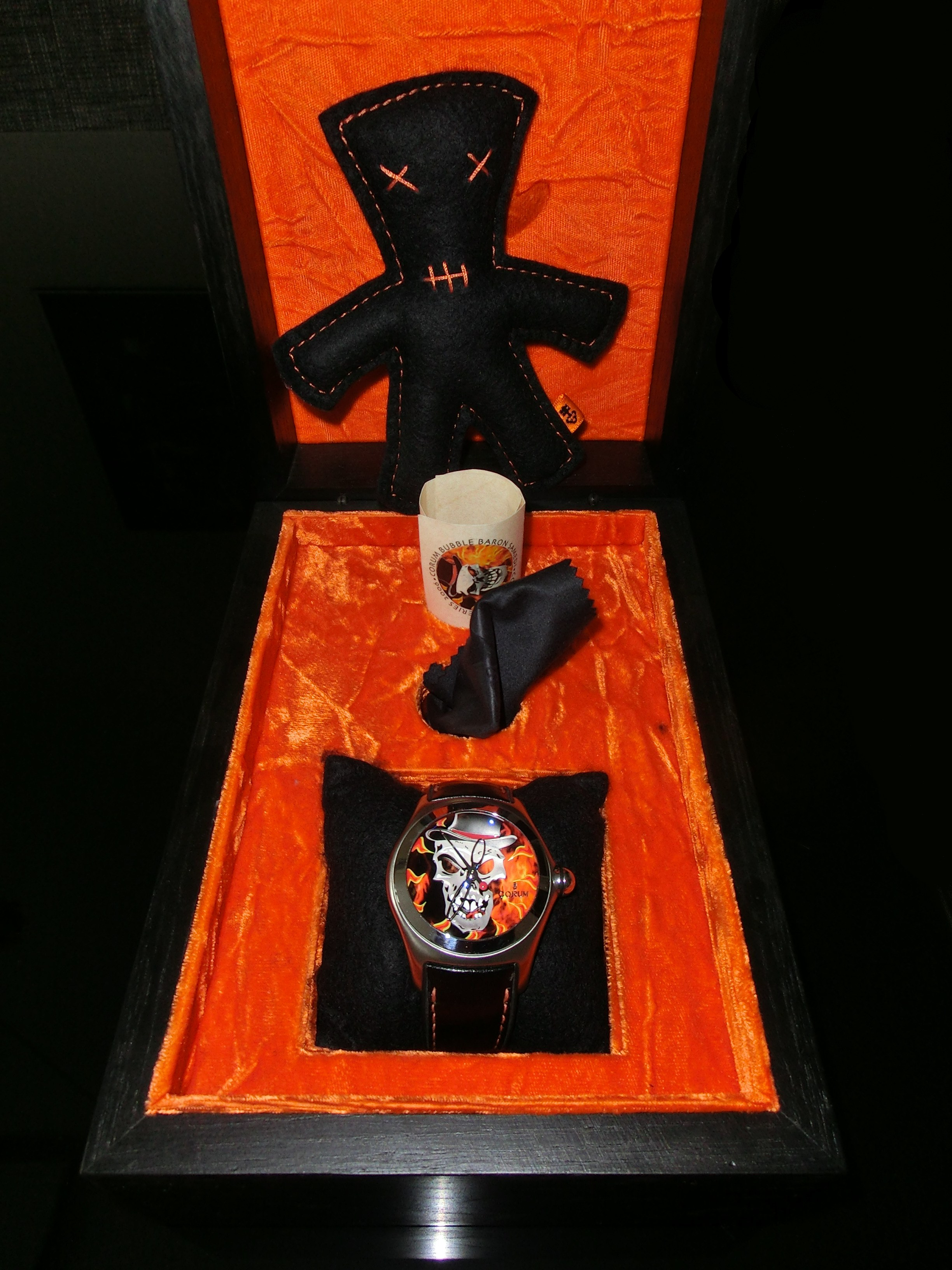
- Corum stainless steel "Bubble Baron Samedi", with watch box
- Industry: Watch manufacturing
- Founded: 1955
- Headquarters: La Chaux-de-Fonds, Switzerland
- Key people: Haso Mehmedovic (CEO)
- Products: Mechanical watches
- Website: www.corum.ch

Corum is a Swiss watchmaking company founded in 1955 by René Bannwart and his uncle Gaston Ries, based in La Chaux-de-Fonds, Canton of Neuchâtel. The benchmark watch series for Corum is its "Admiral's Cup" series. The company was owned by Hong Kong–based Citychamp Watch & Jewellery Group Limited together with Eterna, from 2013 until 2025. In 2025, Corum returned to 100% Swiss ownership following a management-led buyout.

== History ==
In 1933, René Bannwart began his watchmaking career at Patek Philippe, then joined Omega in 1940, where he designed several models, some of which are still sold today. There, he inaugurated and led the creation department. He left the company in 1955 to establish his own brand. Meanwhile, his uncle, Gaston Ries, had been running a watchmaking workshop in La Chaux-de-Fonds for about thirty years.

Corum was founded in 1955 in La Chaux-de-Fonds, Switzerland, by Gaston Ries and his nephew, René Bannwart. The first Corum watches were produced one year later.

The name "Corum" comes from the Latin word quorum, which refers to the minimum number of people required to hold discussions and make decisions in a deliberative assembly. René Bannwart simplified its spelling to “Corum.” The logo is a key pointing toward the sky, symbolizing riddles, mystery, innovation, and watchmaking precision.

Soon after its establishment, Corum introduced a watch made out of a $20 gold coin, which was an instant best-seller. This became one of its signature pieces. Corum is also known for its "World Premiers". Each year, it has produced a limited number of limited edition pieces.

After René, his son Jean-René took over the business.

In January 2000, Corum was acquired by the Severin Wunderman Group. The American businessman had made his fortune by launching Gucci watches. Following the Wundermans’ purchase of Corum, Severin and Michael Wunderman introduced twelve new models for the 2000 Basel Watch Fair. He expanded the brand into the American market and multiplied its points of sale. He later entrusted the company’s redeployment to his son, Michael, and to Antonio Calce, who became Corum’s CEO in 2007.

After Severin Wunderman passed away on 25 June 2008, Michael officially took over the company. In January 2010, its founder René Bannwart, died aged 95.

In 2013, Michael Wunderman sold the company, acquiring partial ownership in the process. Corum was acquired by the Hong Kong–based group China Haidian Holdings Limited (HKEX listed code 256.HK), renamed Citychamp Watch & Jewellery a year later, which already controlled the Swiss brands Eterna and Ernest Borel. Antonio Calce remained at the head of both Corum and Eterna.

He left Corum in April 2014 and was replaced by Jacques-Alain Vuille. From 2015 to 2017, Davide Traxler led Corum. In September 2017, Jérôme Biard became the new CEO of Corum and Eterna, a role he held until the end of 2018.

In May 2025, as Corum celebrated its 70th anniversary, the company changed ownership and became Swiss once again. Corum was acquired by Haso Mehmedovic—who joined the brand as a watchmaker in 2011 and later became its International Sales Director—together with several Swiss investors from the luxury and finance sectors. The acquisition was a management buy-out, orchestrated from within the company by Haso Mehmedovic. Haso Mehmedovic takes the helm of the maison as CEO and Chairman of the Board.

While the year 2025 was dedicated to strengthening the collections, in September 2025 Corum announced its participation— for the first time—at Watches and Wonders Geneva 2026, one of the most prestigious watchmaking events in the world. This announcement represented a milestone for the brand, symbolizing its return to the forefront of the international watchmaking scene. Haso Mehmedovic aims to consolidate existing markets and open new horizons.

The global relaunch is planned for mid-2026. Corum intends to reinforce its distribution by streamlining its network of 300 retailers, revising its after-sales service, and rethinking its overall distribution strategy.

== Leadership ==
Haso Mehmedovic joined Corum in 2011 as a watchmaker after obtaining his diploma in Le Locle, Switzerland. He gradually rose through the ranks, successively holding the positions of Head of Production and Quality, Market Manager, then Sales Director, before becoming International Sales Director.. In 2025, he acquired the company together with several Swiss investors and became its CEO as well as Chairman of the Board.

== Manufacture ==
The Corum manufacture is located in La Chaux-de-Fonds, in the canton of Neuchâtel.

== Production ==
In December 2009, Corum opened a boutique in Hong Kong. One year later, the brand inaugurated its first store in Geneva.

== Models ==
=== Admiral's Cup ===
The Corum Admiral's Cup watch was introduced in 1960 in homage to the Admiral's Cup race, first held in 1957. This first watch was square, water resistant, and had a sailboat engraved on the back. It had little resemblance to the current Corum Admiral's Cup watches with their twelve-sided (Dodecagon) case design and brightly colored nautical pennants decorating the face.

=== Bubble ===
Created by the owner of the brand at the time, Severin Wunderman, the Bubble had an unusual huge sapphire glass face. The line was available in three sizes - mini, midsize and XXL. It was produced from the beginning of the 2000s to the end of the decade. In 2015 this line was reintroduced with different materials.

The XXL had limited edition versions including Lucifer, Baron Samedi, Bats, Joker and Royal Flush.

=== Buckingham ===
Released in the 1960s and part of the "dress" line of the brand, the model features a square 37mm x 37mm case, equipped with either an alligator leather strap or stainless steel Corum-branded mesh integrated into the case. The model is available with either a quartz movement or a manually-wound ETA (Peseux) 7001 movement. Some older models are available with automatic movements. Dials use index markers or English/French wording.

=== Rolls Royce ===
During the 1960s and 1970s, Corum partnered with Rolls Royce.The brand became one of the first watchmaking houses to collaborate with an automobile manufacturer. From this partnership emerged a watch whose case symbolized the grille of the vehicle. Corum introduced the Rolls-Royce model in 1976.

=== Feather watches ===
In 1970, Corum launched the Feather watches, whose dials were decorated with feathers, notably peacock feathers. This technique was based on the use of natural materials applied by hand.

=== Romulus ===
Created in 1966, the Corum Romulus was the first Corum watch to display the hour numerals on the bezel. It sports a sapphire case back engraved with a laurel crown in honor of Romulus, the founder of ancient Rome. It is available in stainless steel, white or yellow gold and a dual time version in either yellow or white gold. The modern models are available in 40 mm or, more recently, 42 mm cases and leather straps or steel bracelets.

=== Golden Bridge ===
The Corum Golden Bridge has four sapphire sides which offer a view of the linear movement, which appears to be floating in mid-air, held only by the gold bridge that names this watch. The Corum Golden Bridge is offered in 18k gold or platinum, and is also available with diamond work.

=== Tourbillon and Classical ===
The Corum Tourbillon and Classical collection comprise the Corum Classical Billionaire Tourbillon, a diamond and sapphire-covered watch, the Corum Golden Tourbillon Panoramique with a tourbillon movement floating between sapphire bridges, and the skeleton-dialed Corum Classical Skylight Skeleton.

=== Coin Watch ===
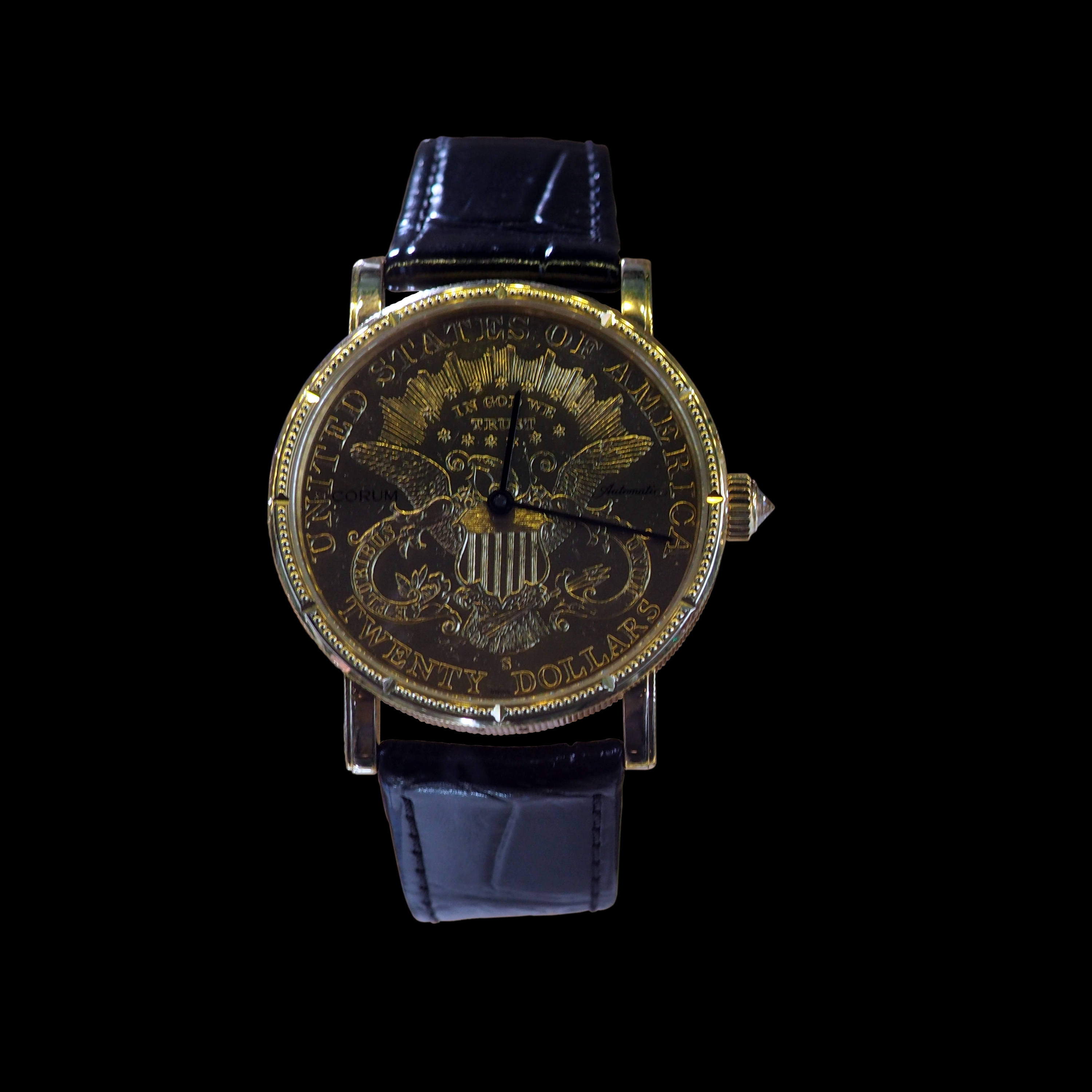
Corum Double eagle coin watch.

The Coin Watch was launched in 1964. Ultra-thin and without a bezel, it is distinguished by a dial crafted from an American $20 Double Eagle gold coin. Corum has produced coin watches for over fifty years, with automatic, manual wind or quartz movements. They are available with a $20 Double eagle, $10 or $5 “Liberty” coin for a dial. They are also available with a diamond bezel. Over the decades, the Coin Watch has been worn by numerous political and cultural figures, including several Presidents of the United States.

=== Artisan Timepieces ===
The Corum Artisan watch line is defined by dials depicting wild animals, exotic locales, or historic scenes. These are limited edition watches.

More broadly, many Corum watches have been worn by international celebrities, especially between the 1980s and 2000s. Among the personalities associated with Corum are Elvis Presley, several U.S. presidents, Robert De Niro, Johnny Depp, Naomi Campbell, Jackie Chan, Cristiano Ronaldo, Andy Voirol, and Mike Tyson.

== Partnerships ==
Corum was also the maker of the World Series of Poker watches that accompanied the World Series of Poker bracelet in 2007 and became the maker of the bracelets themselves in 2007.

In 2011, the brand partnered with the French team AC45 Energy Team led by the Peyron brothers for the America’s Cup, serving as Official Timekeeper. That same year, skipper Loïck Peyron, already a brand ambassador, became responsible for Corum’s sailing sponsorship. In parallel, the athlete helped develop a new regatta-function watch to create a navigation instrument.

In 2017, Corum and the French amphibious boat manufacturer Iguana Yachts formed a partnership during the 40th Cannes Yachting Festival.
