= Trium =

Brand of mobile phones by Mitsubishi

Trium is a discontinued brand of mobile phones made by Mitsubishi Electric. Models included the Trium Mars, Trium Eclipse, Trium 110, Trium Aria, Trium Astral, Trium Aura, Trium Cosmo, Trium Galaxy, Trium Laser, Trium GEO, Trium M21i, Trium M320, Trium Mondo, Trium Mystral, Trium Neptune, Trium Odyssey, Trium Sirius, Trium ONE, Trium D2, Trium M341i.
