= Coin watch =

Watch inserted into a coin or medal

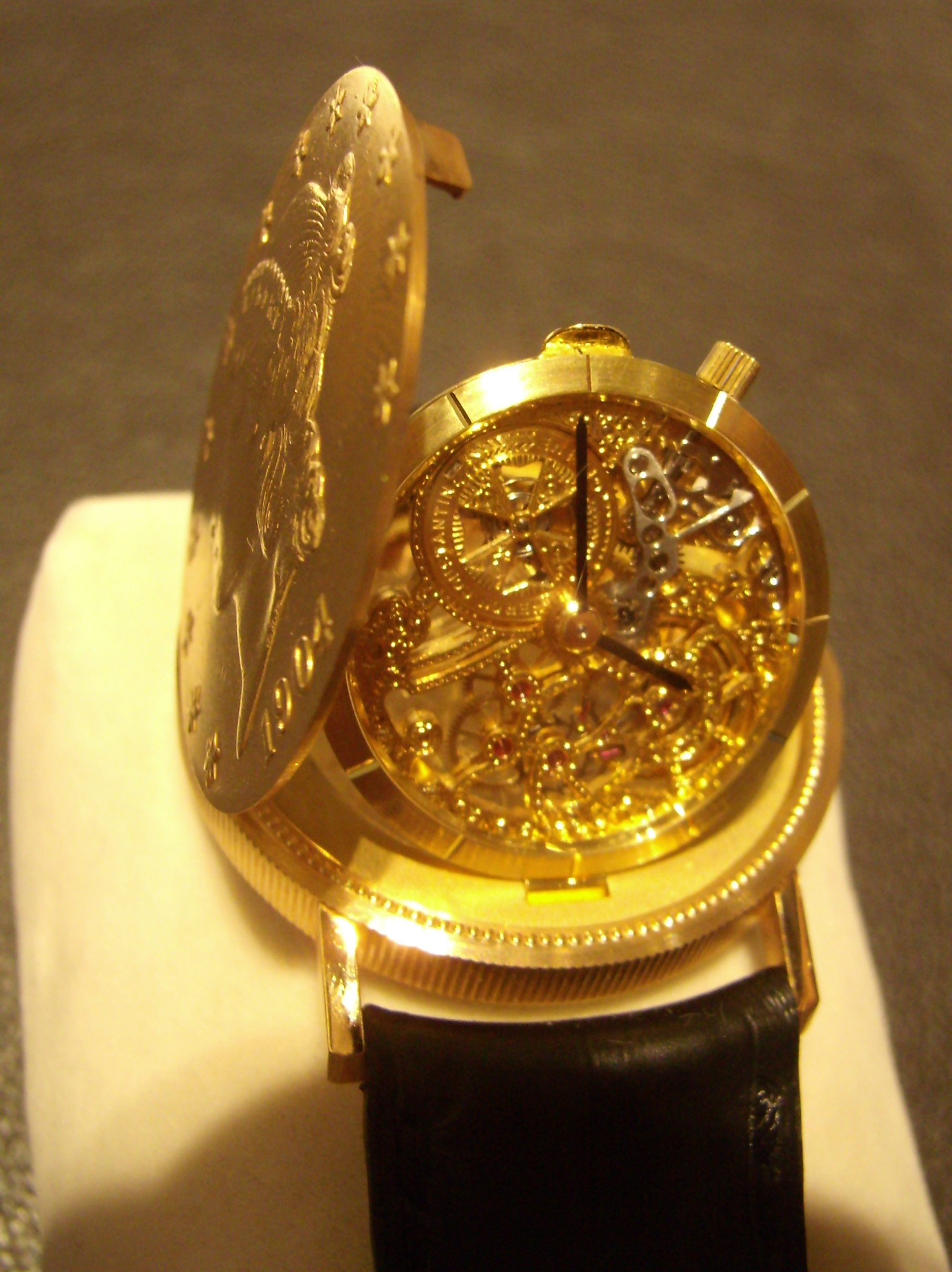
VC coin watch, with attachments for a wrist strap

A coin watch or medal watch comprises a watch inserted into a coin or medal.

A coin watch is typically made by slicing a coin into two disks, one thinner than the other; or by removing one face of a coin. A watch mechanism is then embedded into the thicker part, and the two faces joined by a concealed hinge and catch. When closed, the watch is hidden and the coin looks like any other.

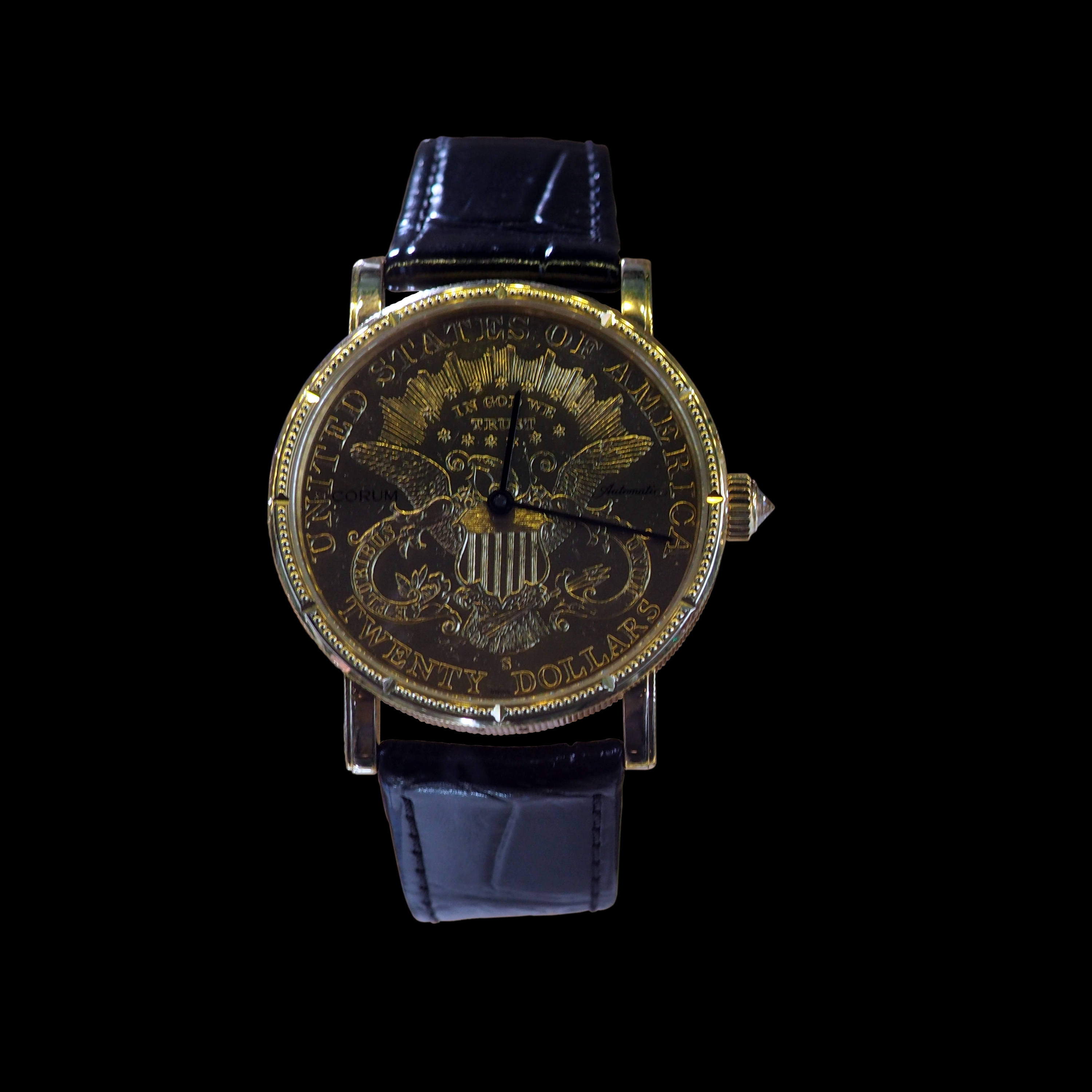
Corum coin watch

Noted makers of coin watches include Cartier and Corum.

== See also ==
- List of watch manufacturers
- Dollar watch
- Counterfeit watch
- Mystery watch
