= Mystery watch =

Type of watch

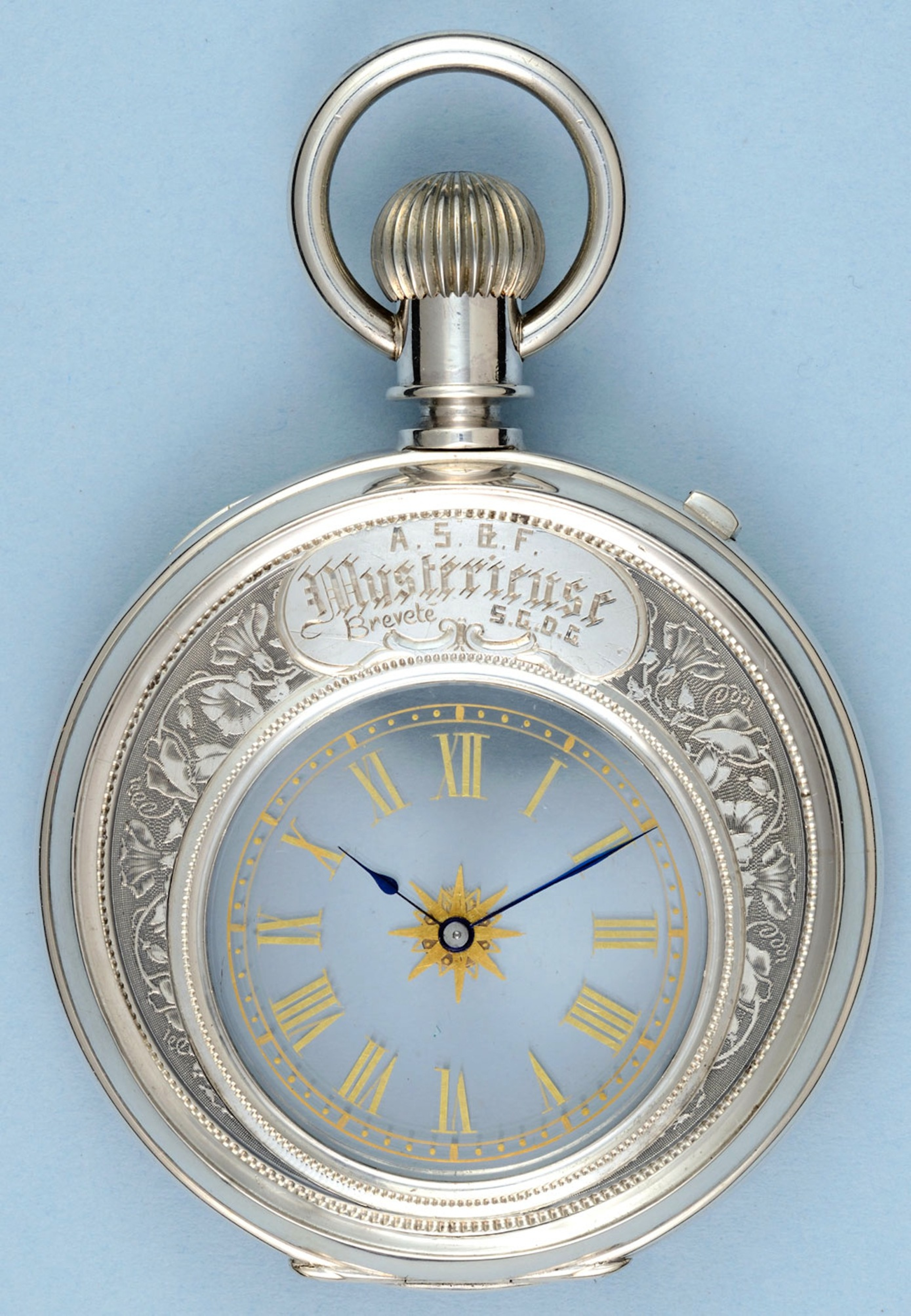
Montre mystérieuse (mystery watch), circa 1889, Musée d'Horlogerie of Le Locle, Switzerland. It is the first transparent watch.

A mystery watch or mystery clock, in horology, is a timepiece whose working is not easily deducible, because it seems to have no movement at all, or the hands do not seem to be connected to any movement.

One example is a type of mechanical watch where the movement is transmitted to the hands through a transparent crystal toothed wheel.

The first see-through watch, known in French as 'montre mystérieuse' ("mysterious watch"), was said to be invented by Hugues Rime in the late 19th century, who had a patent for the watch. Rime's watch was marketed by the French firm Armand Schwob et frère, and made in Switzerland.

It has also been said that Jean-Eugène Robert-Houdin was the inventor of the mystery watch in the 19th century. Robert-Houdin was a watchmaker, like his father, and later became a magician. He has been credited with the creation of the mystery watch as well.

As an item of historical/horological value, it is preserved in various museum collections, such as the British Museum, the German Clock Museum, the International Museum of Horology, the Musée d'Horlogerie of Le Locle (Switzerland), the Musée d'art et d'histoire de Neuchâtel, the U.S. National Watch and Clock Museum, and the Vienna Clock and Watch Museum.

== See also ==
- List of watch manufacturers
- Dollar watch
