= Steps of Legacy =

2025 exhibition

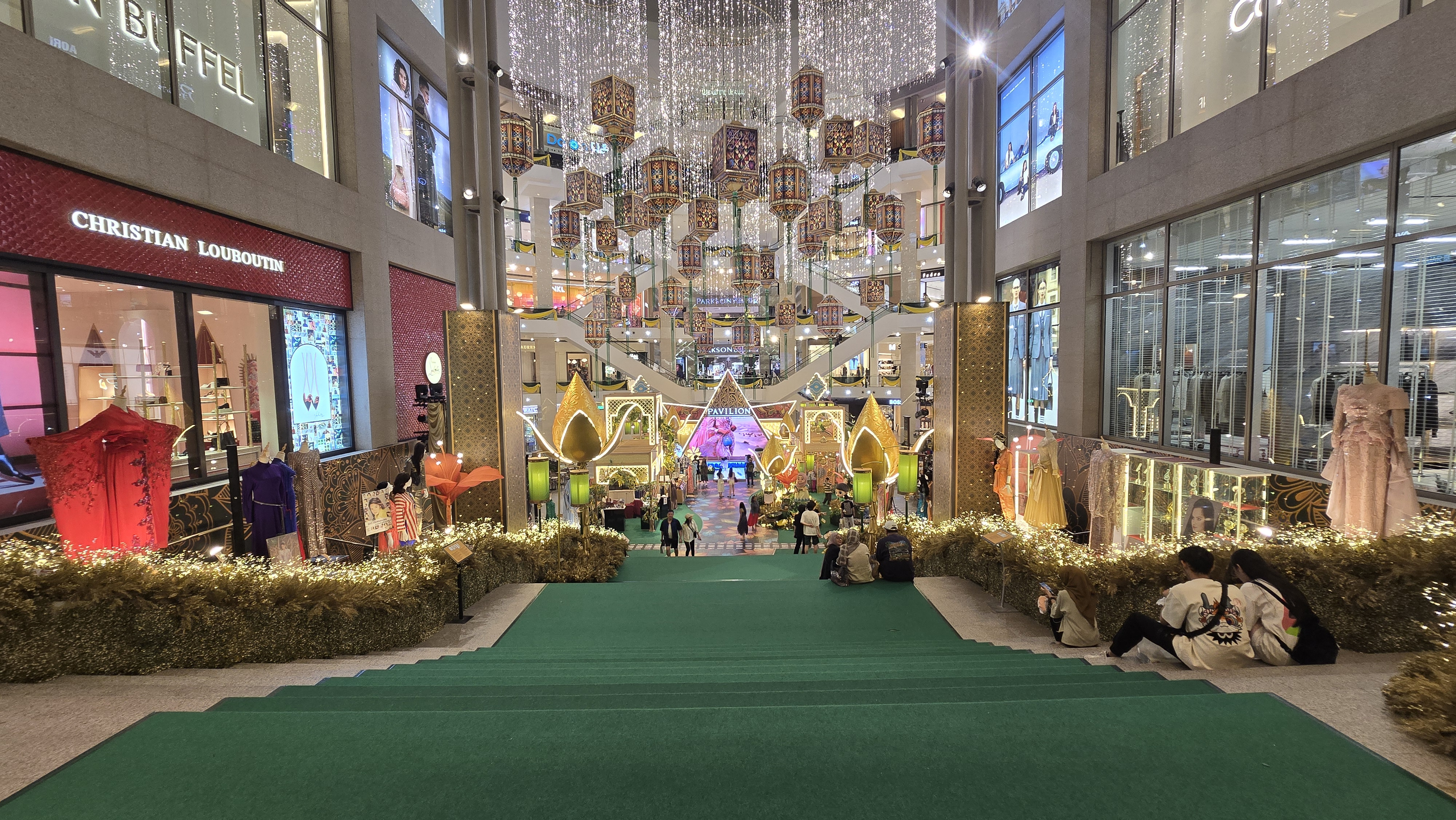
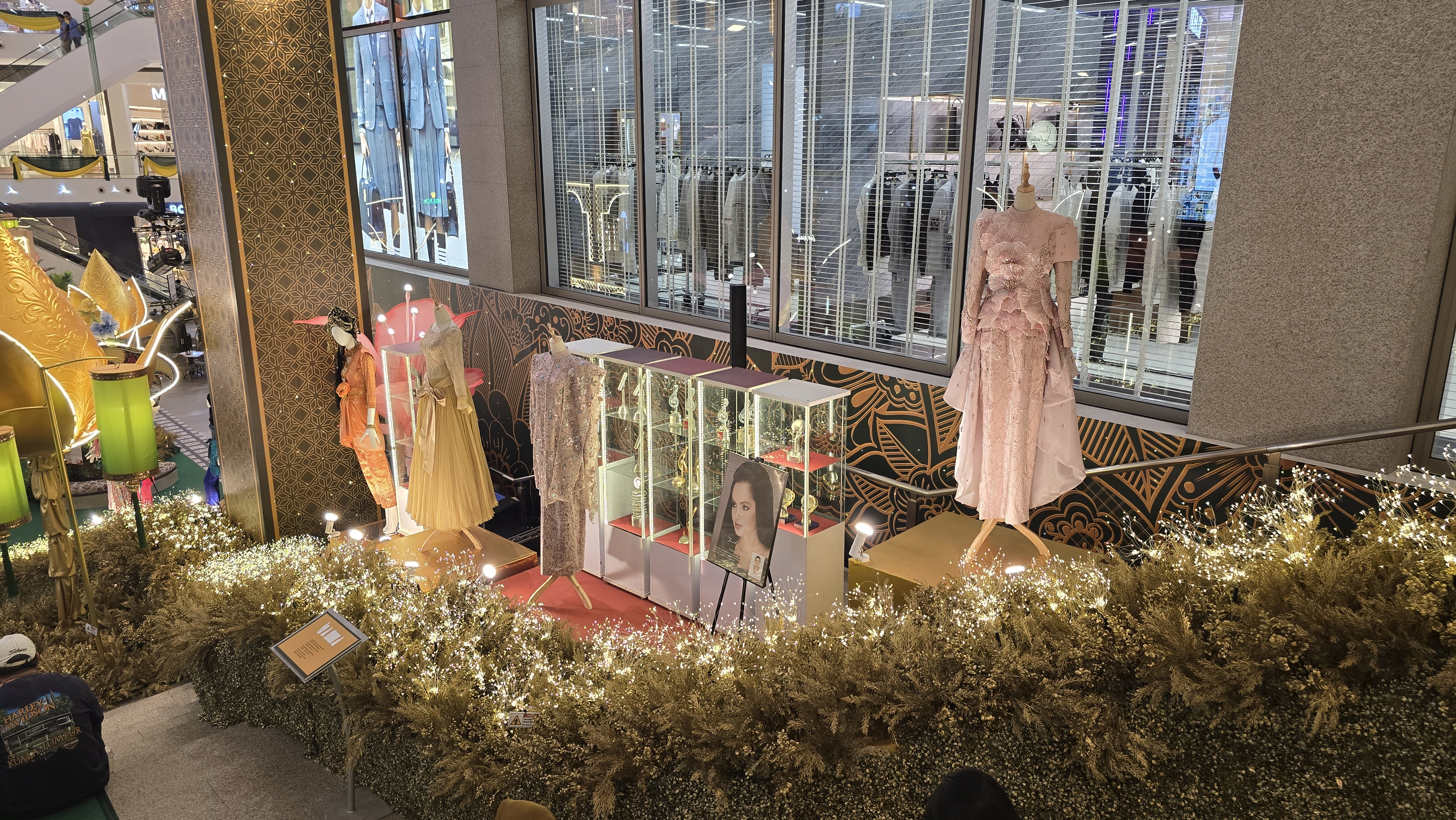
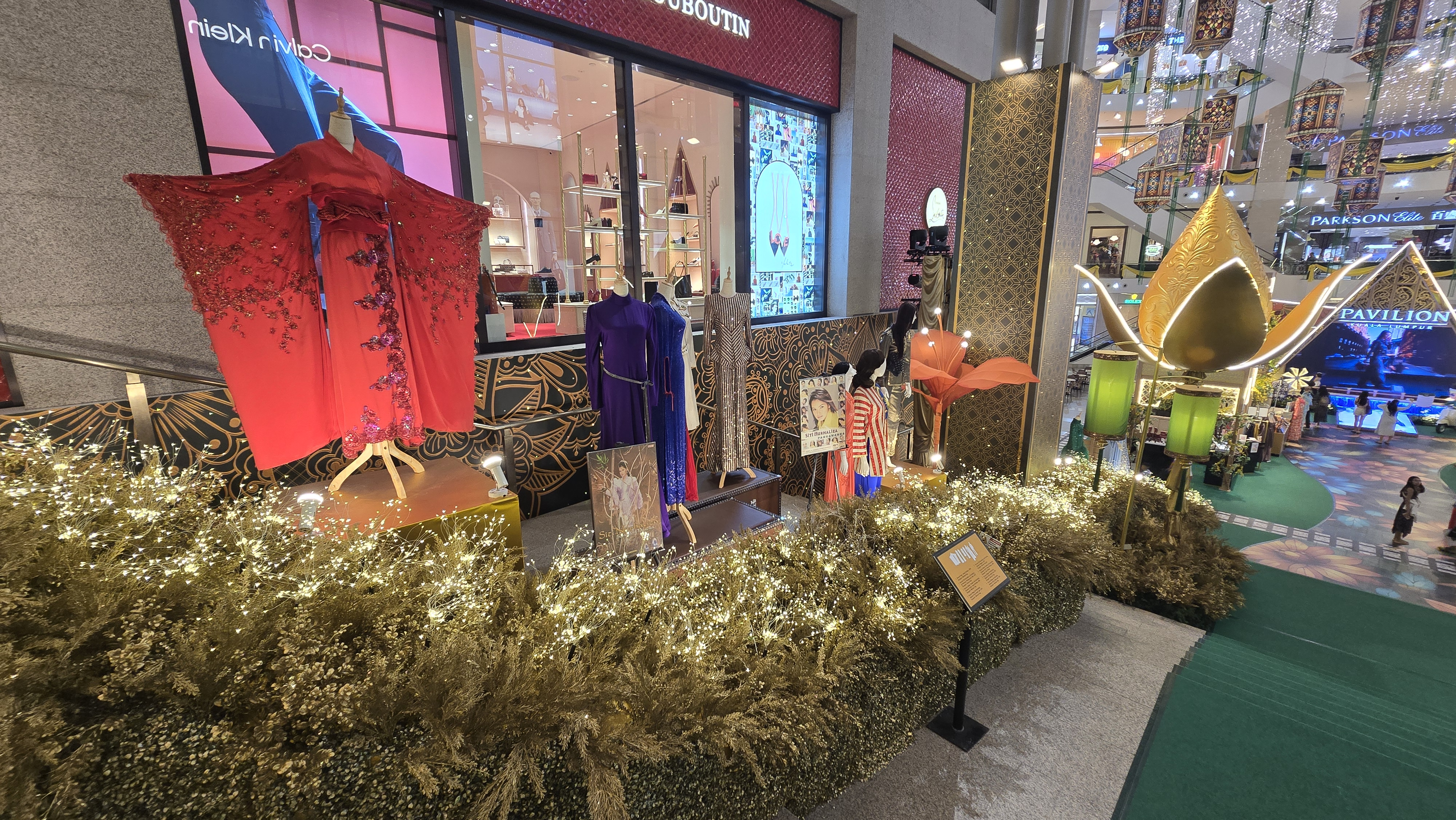
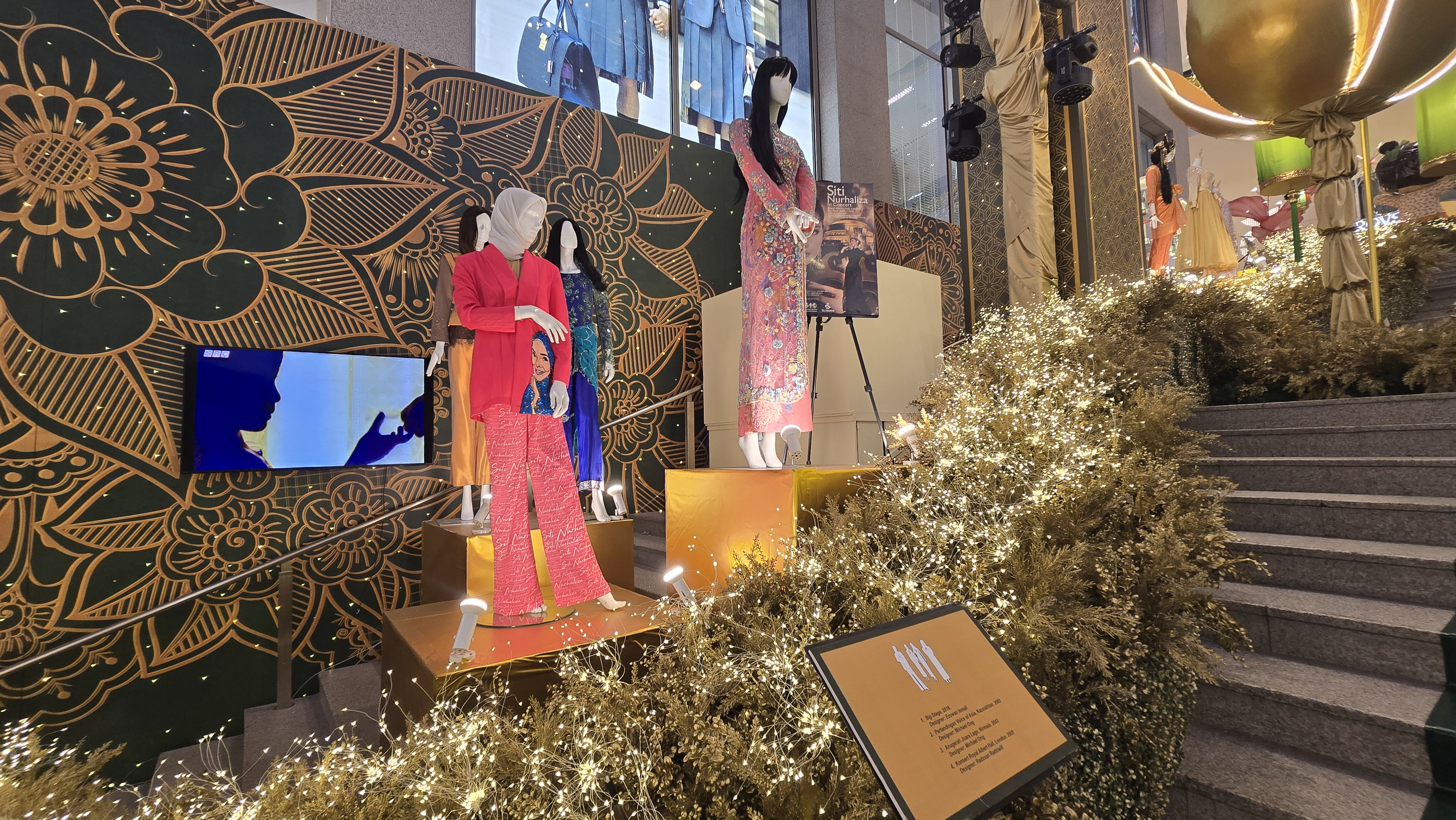
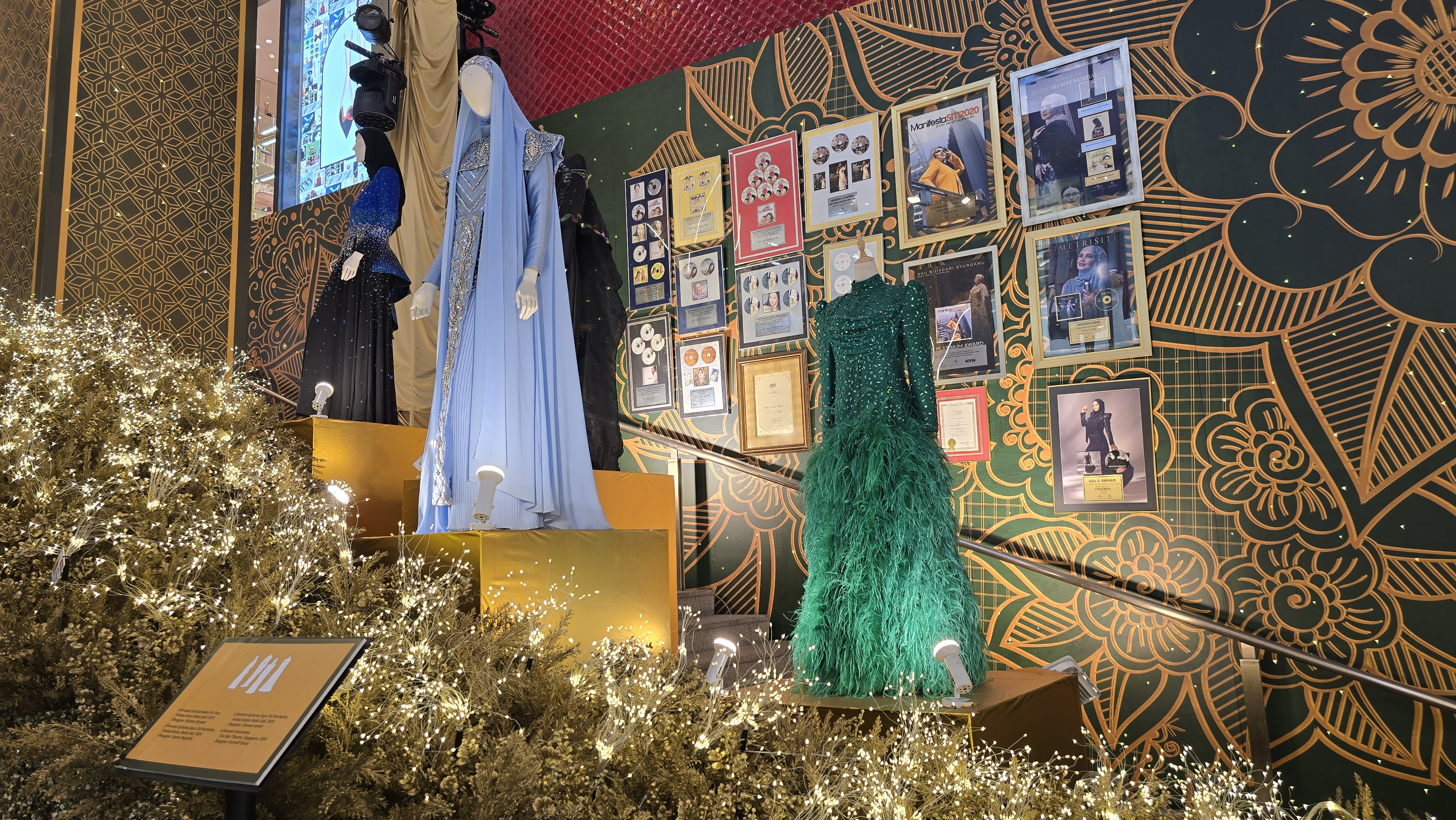
- On-site view and memorabilia on display
- Date: 1 March – 6 April 2025
- Venue: Spanish Steps, Pavilion Kuala Lumpur, Kuala Lumpur, Malaysia
- Location: 3°08′56″N 101°42′48″E
- Type: Free public admission
- Theme: Siti Nurhaliza
- Organised by: Pavilion Kuala Lumpur

Steps of Legacy was a month-long exhibition celebrating 30 years of history and achievements made by Malaysian recording artist Siti Nurhaliza, held from 1 March until 6 April 2025. As part of Budaya Raya, a Hari Raya campaign organized by Pavilion Kuala Lumpur, the exhibition showcased select awards, plaques, posters, and outfits that she has worn throughout her musical career.

The exhibition took place at the Spanish Steps of Pavilion Kuala Lumpur, with various activities related to Siti taking place, including meet-and-greet events on 9 and 16 March 2025. On 12 March, she and her niece, Umairah, launched their own Hari Raya singles, "Raya Nak Ke Mana?" and "Tak Balik Raya" respectively. It concluded with "Siti Nurhaliza's 30th Anniversary" event on 6 April 2025.

== Background and development ==
Siti Nurhaliza made her foray into the music industry after winning a national singing competition, Bintang HMI, in 1995. Throughout her 30-year music career, she has had international awards and she was recognized as "Biduanita Negara" (National Songstress) at the Malaysia Ministry of Tourism, Arts and Culture National Arts Awards in 2024. In an interview with Utusan Malaysia, she dreamt of having her own gallery; however, no location has been identified.

To celebrate Hari Raya of 2025, Pavilion Kuala Lumpur came up with the concept of Budaya Raya (The Culture of Hari Raya) for their campaign. One highlight showcased Siti Nurhaliza's career milestones and her Hari Raya memories. She was the first Malaysian artist to be invited by the mall to exhibit her personal collection. Siti commented that it was an honour to celebrate her 30 years in the music industry. She thought it a waste to keep her memorabilia locked away in glass cabinets, better for her "fans to view her collections". (Note: Original:"[...] boleh jadi permulaan buat peminat untuk menyaksikan koleksi saya.")

She chose 20 outfits to be displayed, including the dress that she wore during Anugerah Juara Lagu, and a few from her concerts, including Konsert Salam Terakhir and Siti Nurhaliza in Concert at the Royal Albert Hall in London. She didn't keep many of the early outfits as she rented them. It was when she performed "Cindai" during the 13th Anugerah Juara Lagu when she started keeping them, starting with the orange songket dress designed by Radzuan Radziwill. Also on display were the trophies that she had won.

== Exhibition contents and activities ==
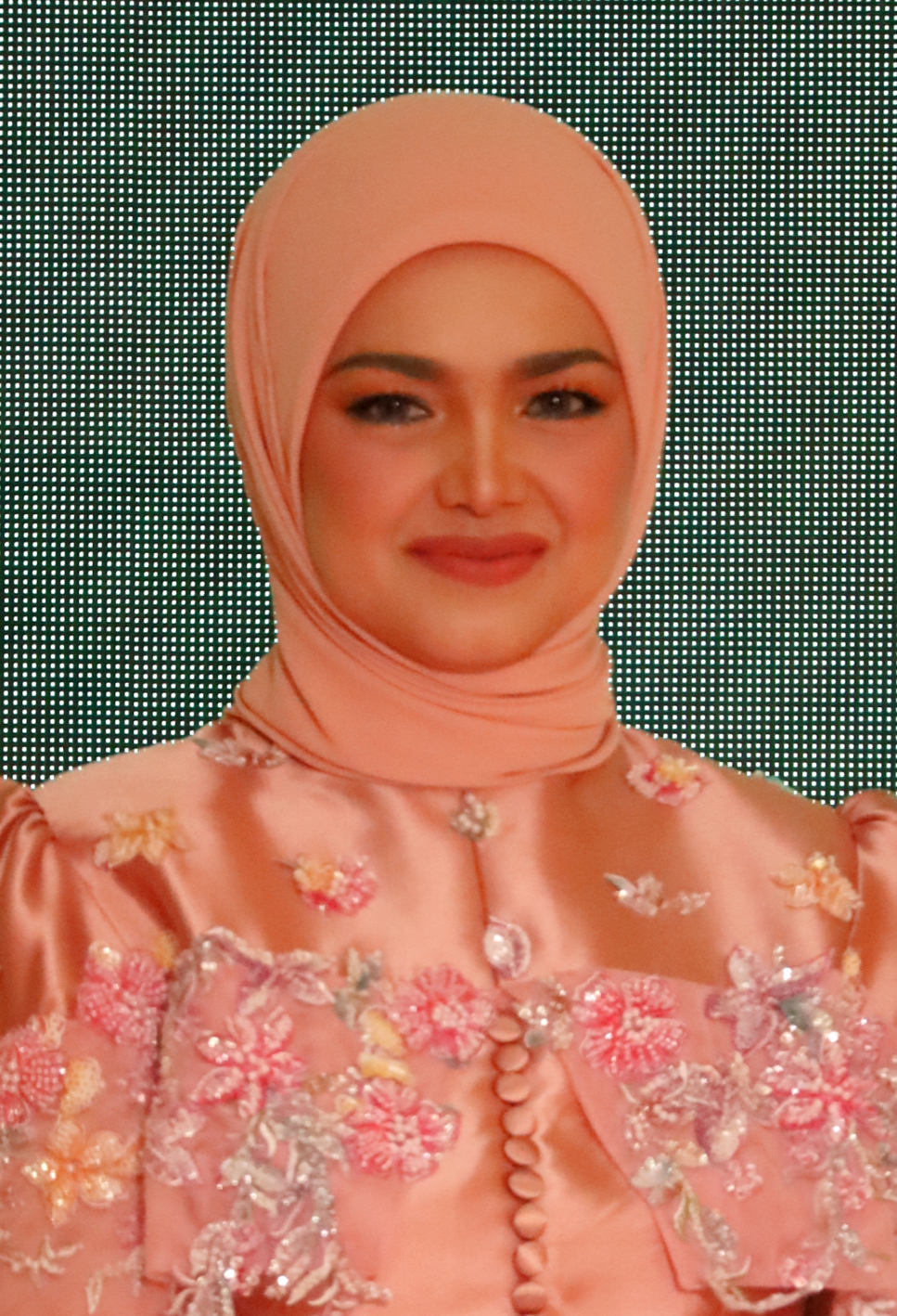
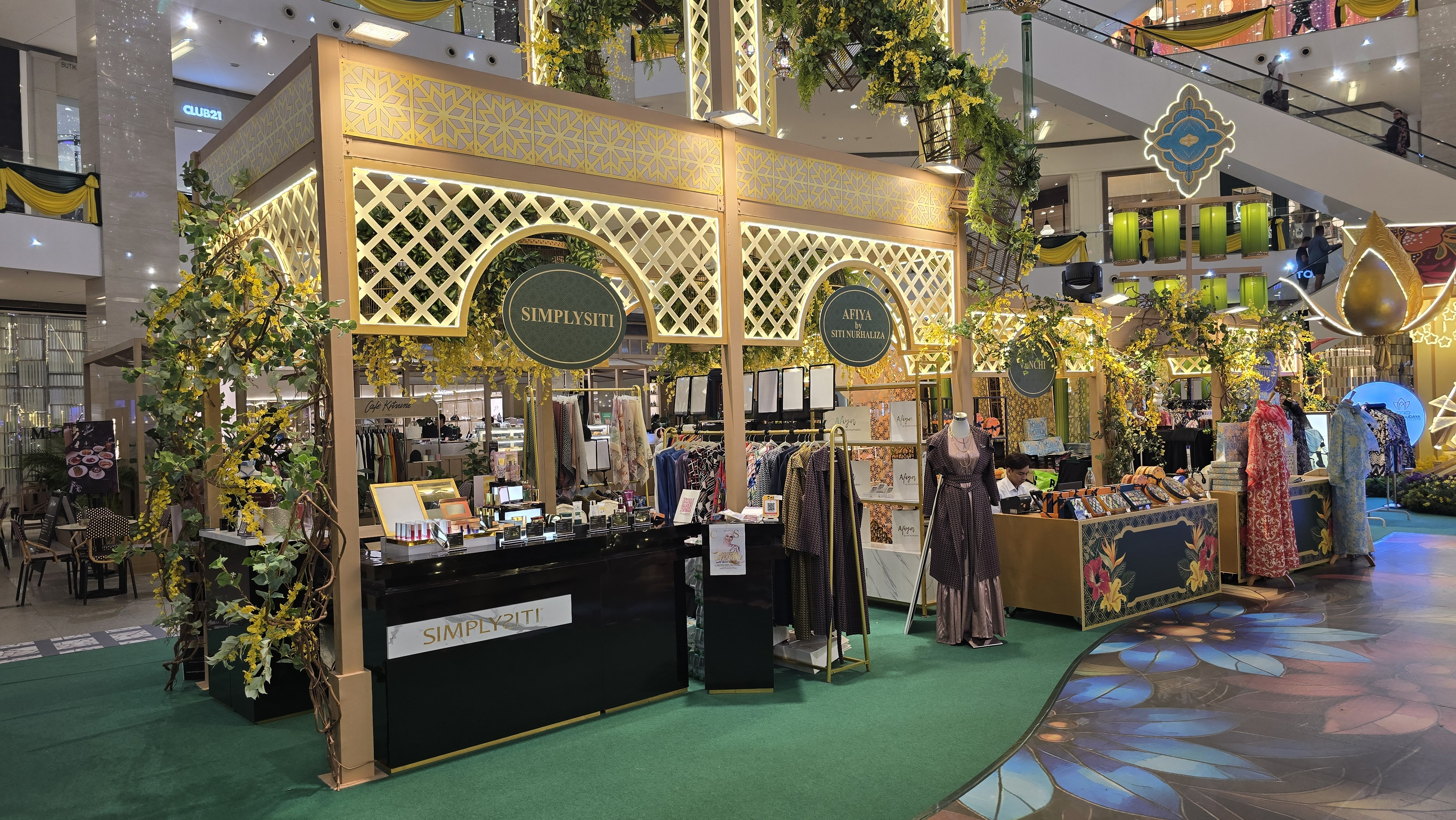
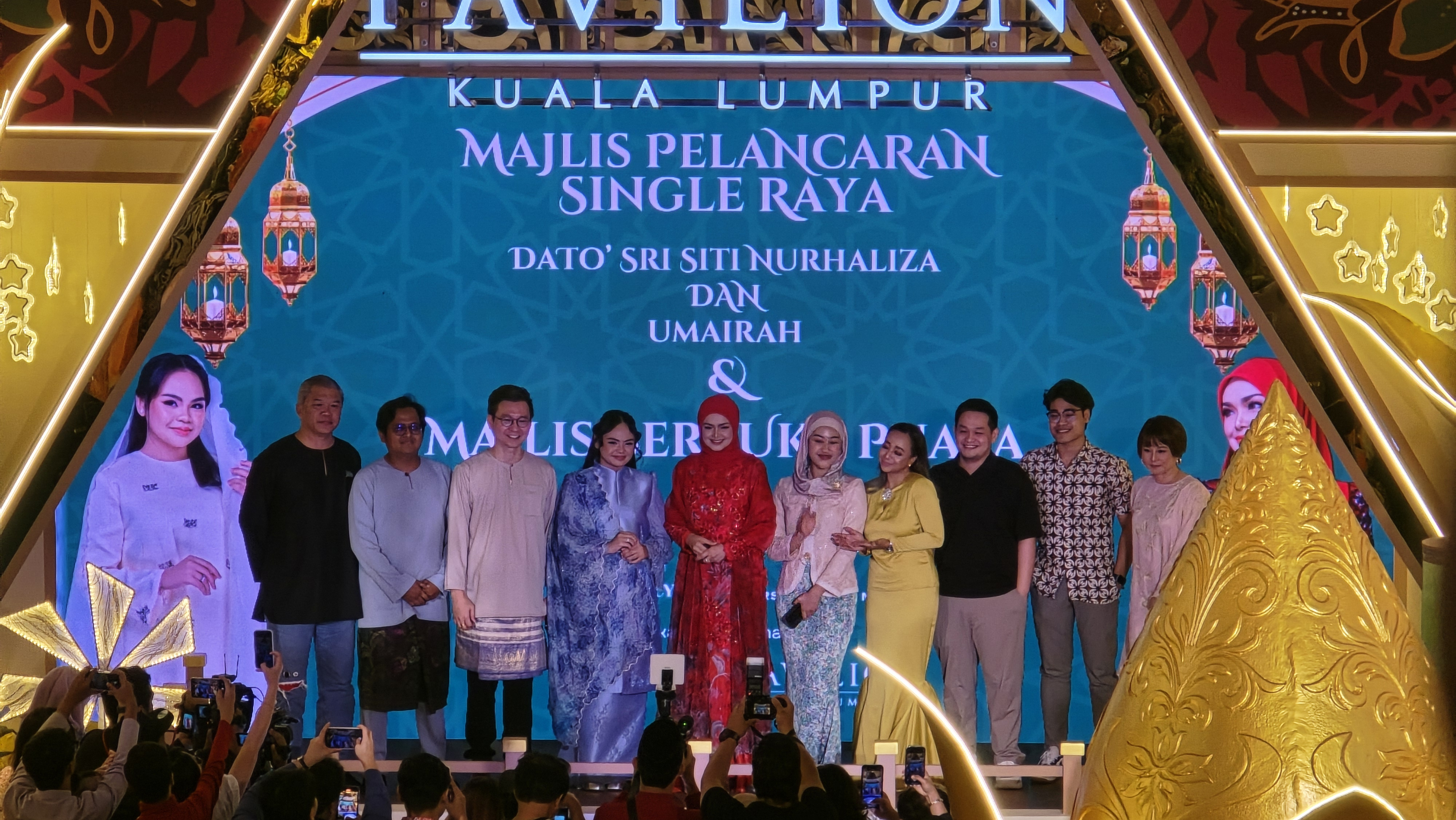
Clockwise from top:
- Siti at her 30th anniversary event
- Her business's booths at the mall's Center Court
- Siti (in red) and Umairah (in blue) at the launch of their Hari Raya singles

Steps of Legacy was opened to the public on 1 March and officially launched on 5 March 2025. Taking place at the mall's Spanish Steps, it was a part of Pavilion Kuala Lumpur's Hari Raya campaign, Budaya Raya. During its entire run, various events and activities related to Siti Nurhaliza took place at the location. At the mall's Center Court, there were booths for her cosmetic brand, SimplySiti, and her clothing brand, Afiya by Siti Nurhaliza.

On 8, 9, and 16 March 2025, SimplySiti organized three makeup demonstrations, and on 9 and 16 March, she was present for meet-and-greet sessions. On 12 March, Siti and her niece, Umairah, who is also a singer under the management of SN Legacy, which Siti also owns, launched their respective Hari Raya singles — "Raya Nak Ke Mana?" ("Where to Go for Raya?") and "Tak Balik Raya" ("Not Back for Raya").

The exhibition concluded on 6 April 2025 with the Siti Nurhaliza 30th Anniversary held at the Centre Court during the first week of Hari Raya. Pavilion Kuala Lumpur and Cuckoo organized the event for Siti to celebrate both her 30th career anniversary and Hari Raya with her fans.

=== Outfits on display ===
Media	Year	Designer	Event	Description
	1998	Radzuan Radziwill	1998 Anugerah Juara Lagu	Crafted from songket, she wore this during the final of 1998 Anugerah Juara Lagu, where she performed "Cindai" and was crowned as the overall winner.
	2001	Michael Ong	Konsert Mega Siti Nurhaliza	Originally fitted with supporting cables, the lights on the outfit were switched on as she glided down onto the main stage during the opening segment of Konsert Mega Siti Nurhaliza.
	2001	Michael Ong	Konsert Mega Siti Nurhaliza	A white uniform that Siti wore during a segment for Konsert Mega Siti Nurhaliza. The segment intended to highlight Siti's original ambition to join a uniform body before finally choosing to become a singer. During the concert, she marched on stage with an M16 rifle, accompanied by 100 officers from the Royal Malaysian Navy, before performing a few songs, including "Kini Kau Disisi" and "Engkau Bagaikan Permata".
	2001	Michael Ong	Konsert Mega Siti Nurhaliza	An orange dress worn by Siti during a segment for Konsert Mega Siti Nurhaliza. During the segment, she performed a gymnastic routine with a hoop.
	2002	Den Wahab	Konsert Salam Terakhir	Made to replicate the Malaysian flag pattern, Siti wore this outfit during one of the segments of her 2002 tribute concert to Sudirman, Konsert Salam Terakhir.
	2002	Michael Ong	Konsert Salam Terakhir	One of the multiple outfits she wore during her 2002 Sudirman tribute concert, Konsert Salam Terakhir.
	2002	Michael Ong	Voice of Asia 2002	One of the three outfits she brought when representing Malaysia at Voice of Asia 2002. She was crowned the Grand Prix winner at the competition.
	2003	Michael Ong	2002 Anugerah Juara Lagu	A blue outfit that Siti Nurhaliza wore while performing "Nirmala" during the final of 2002 Anugerah Juara Lagu. She won "Best Performance," and the song won "Best Irama Malaysia".
	2005	Radzuan Radziwill	Siti Nurhaliza in Concert	A pink dress that she had worn during the traditional music segment of her Siti Nurhaliza in Concert at the Royal Albert Hall in London.
	2006	Khoon Hooi	2005 Anugerah Bintang Popular Berita Harian	A gold dress that Siti wore when she won Most Popular Female Artist during the 2005 Anugerah Bintang Popular Bintang Harian. She was named as Best Dressed Artist (Female) at the event.
	2009	Michael Ong	Konsert Satu	Bright red kimono that she wore when she was performing "Kurniaan Dalam Samaran". During the actual concert, there was "a long train cascading over the stage's platforms" attached to the kimono.
	2013	Khoon Hooi	Siti Nurhaliza in Symphony	A purple dress that Siti wore during one of the nights of her Siti Nurhaliza in Symphony concert residency.
	2016	Rizman Ruzaini	Dato' Siti Nurhaliza & Friends Concert	A golden striped dress with a red base and side panels that she wore during Dato' Siti Nurhaliza & Friends Concert. The final outfit for the concert, it was designed and crafted with imported sequin fabric.
	2018	Ezuwan Ismail	Vivo V11/V11i Grand Launch Concert	A pink outfit with a print of Siti's own face on the bottom half of the jacket. She wore this outfit during her performance at the Vivo V11/V11i Grand Launch Concert in 2018.
	2019	Rizman Ruzaini	Dato' Sri Siti Nurhaliza On Tour	She wore the dress during one of the segments at the final stop of Dato' Sri Siti Nurhaliza On Tour in Kuala Lumpur.
	2024	Ezuwan Ismail	Sebuah Epitome: Saya Siti Nurhaliza	A light blue dress with beaded craftwork and pointed shoulders that she wore during the opening of "Sebuah Epitome: Saya Siti Nurhaliza" concert.
	2024	Samm Republic	Sebuah Epitome: Saya Siti Nurhaliza	A black dress featuring beaded craftsmanship in various bird motifs, symbolizing freedom. The flag of Palestine was the main inspiration for the bead colours.
	2024	Ashraff Zainal	Fenomena - Live in Singapore	The green dress that Siti wore as her third outfit for the second day of her "Fenomena - Live in Singapore" concert in Singapore.
	2024	Ezuwan Ismail	Anugerah Seni Negara (National Arts Awards)	She wore the dress during the acceptance of the "Biduanita Negara" (National Songstress) title at the 2024 Malaysia Ministry of Tourism, Arts and Culture National Arts Awards.
	2024	Bianca Bella	Love is in the Sky Concert	A dress that Siti wore during one of the nights for her "Love is in the Sky" concert at the Arena of Stars, Genting Highlands in 2024.

=== Gold and platinum records on display ===
Media	Year	Work	Format	Description
	2001	Siti Nurhaliza II	Album	6× platinum record for her sophomore solo studio album, Siti Nurhaliza II (Aku Cinta Padamu), for selling more than 300,000 units.
	2001	Cindai	Album	5× platinum record for her third solo studio album, Cindai, for selling more than 250,000 units.
	2001	Adiwarna	Album	4× platinum record for her fourth solo studio album, Adiwarna, for selling more than 200,000 units.
	2001	Pancawarna	Album	2× platinum record for her fifth solo studio album, Adiwarna, for selling more than 100,000 units.
	2001	Sahmura	Album	2× platinum record for her sixth solo studio album, Sahmura, for selling more than 100,000 units.
	2004	E.M.A.S	Album	2× platinum record for her seventh solo studio album, E.M.A.S, for selling more than 100,000 units.
	2007	Siti Nurhaliza In Concert, Royal Albert Hall London	Album	3× platinum record for her live album, Siti Nurhaliza In Concert, Royal Albert Hall London, for selling more than 60,000 units.
	2007	Transkripsi	Album	4× platinum record for her eleventh solo studio album, Transkripsi, for selling more than 80,000 units.
	2014	Fragmen	Album	Gold record for her seventeenth solo studio album, Fragmen, for selling more than 5,000 units.
	2019	SimetriSiti	Album	Gold record for her eighteenth solo studio album, SimetriSiti, for selling more than 5,000 units.
	2019	"Anta Permana"	Single	11× platinum record for her single, "Anta Permana", for selling more than 2,200,000 units.
	2019	"Comel Pipi Merah"	Single	4× platinum record for her single, "Comel Pipi Merah", for selling more than 800,000 units.
	2019	"Cinta Syurga"	Single	1× gold record for her single with Khai Bahar, "Cinta Syurga", for selling more than 150,000 units.
	2020	"ManifestaSITI2020"	Album	Gold record for her nineteenth solo album, "ManifestaSITI2020", for selling more than 5,000 physical units.
	2021	"Aku Bidadari Syurgamu"	Single	2× platinum record for her single, "Aku Bidadari Syurgamu", for its digital single achievement.

=== Select awards and certificates on display ===
Media	Year	Nominated work	Host country	Event/Organization	Description
	1995	Siti Nurhaliza	Malaysia	Hiburan Minggu Ini (HMI)	A certificate to certify Siti as the winner of the singing competition Bintang HMI in 1995.
	1999	Siti Nurhaliza	Malaysia	Suria Records	A special award awarded to Siti by her then-recording company, Suria Records, in 1999.
	2001	"Engkau Bagaikan Permata"	Malaysia	Anugerah Juara Lagu	Awarded to Siti as the winner of the Pop Rock category for her performance of "Engkau Bagaikan Permata" during the 2001 Anugerah Juara Lagu.
	2001	Siti Nurhaliza	Malaysia	The Malaysia Book of Records	Awarded by The Malaysia Book of Records for being the most award-winning Malaysian artist in 2001.
	2002	Siti Nurhaliza	Malaysia	Anugerah Bintang Popular Berita Harian	Awarded during 2002 Anugerah Bintang Popular Berita Harian as Popular Female Singer.
	2004	Siti Nurhaliza	Indonesia	SCTV Music Awards	Awarded during the Indonesian 2004 SCTV Music Awards for Artis Asing Paling Ngetop (Top Foreign Artist).
	2005	Siti Nurhaliza	Malaysia	Anugerah Bintang Popular Berita Harian	Awarded during 2004 Anugerah Bintang Popular Berita Harian as Popular Female Singer. It also marked her eighth consecutive time winning the same award.
	2005	Siti Nurhaliza	Malaysia	Anugerah Bintang Popular Berita Harian	Awarded during 2004 Anugerah Bintang Popular Berita Harian as the Most Popular Star with 110,585 votes received. As the overall winner, it also marked her sixth time winning the same award.
	2005	Siti Nurhaliza	Malaysia	Ministry of Tourism, Arts and Culture	Awarded by the Malaysian Ministry of Tourism, Arts and Culture in 2005 for her contribution to the Malaysian music industry after staging her concert at the Royal Albert Hall in London.
	2006	Siti Nurhaliza	Malaysia	The Malaysia Book of Records	Awarded during the Malaysia Book of Records Awards Night 2006 for "First to Hold a Solo Concert at Royal Albert Hall London".
	2006	Siti Nurhaliza	Malaysia	Anugerah Era	Awarded during 2006 Anugerah Era for the Choice Female Vocalist category.
	2007	"Biarlah Rahsia"	Singapore	Anugerah Planet Muzik	Awarded during 2007 Anugerah Planet Muzik for the Best Song category.
	2007	Transkripsi	Singapore	Anugerah Planet Muzik	Awarded during 2007 Anugerah Planet Muzik for the Best Female Artist category.
	2010	Siti Nurhaliza	Malaysia	Anugerah Bintang Popular Berita Harian	Awarded during 2009 Anugerah Bintang Popular Berita Harian as Popular Female Singer. It also marked her 13th consecutive time winning the same award.
	2010	Siti Nurhaliza	Malaysia	Anugerah Bintang Popular Berita Harian	Awarded during 2009 Anugerah Bintang Popular Berita Harian as the Most Popular Star with 225,300 votes received. As the overall winner, it also marked her seventh time winning the same award.
	2011	Siti Nurhaliza	Malaysia	Anugerah Bintang Popular Berita Harian	A special award awarded to Siti during the Anugerah Bintang Popular Berita Harian's 25th anniversary.
	2014	"Lebih Indah"	Singapore	Anugerah Planet Muzik	Awarded during 2014 Anugerah Planet Muzik for the Best Artist (Female) category.
	2015	Siti Nurhaliza	Malaysia	Anugerah MeleTOP Era	Awarded during 2015 Anugerah MeleTOP Era for Penyanyi Meletop (Top Singer) and Bintang Online Meletop (Top Online Star) categories.
	2016	"Menatap dalam Mimpi"	Malaysia	Anugerah Industri Muzik	Awarded to Siti during the 22nd Anugerah Industri Muzik for Best Vocal Performance in a Song (Female) category through her single, "Menatap dalam Mimpi".
	2016	Siti Nurhaliza	Malaysia	Anugerah Industri Muzik	Awarded to Siti during the 22nd Anugerah Industri Muzik for the Malaysia's Choice Singer category.
	2024	Siti Nurhaliza	Malaysia	Anugerah Seni Negara (National Arts Awards), Ministry of Tourism, Arts and Culture	Awarded by the Malaysian Ministry of Tourism, Arts and Culture in 2024 to certify Siti as "Biduanita Negara" (National Songstress) at the National Arts Awards.

== Reception ==
The Budaya Raya campaign was said to be one of the most festive, most "Instagrammable", and must-visit Hari Raya experiences for Malaysians in 2025. Griselda Jevon of Tatler Asia named Pavilion Kuala Lumpur, with its Budaya Raya decorations as one of the most stunning decorations in Klang Valley. Zikry Ismail of The Rakyat Post wrote that Pavilion Kuala Lumpur was a mall with the most festive Hari Raya decorations in 2025.

Zoe of Remaja highlighted the Siti Nurhaliza exhibition of Budaya Raya as a "golden opportunity" for visitors. Rusul Ismail, writing for SirapLimau, write that the exhibition is the main attraction of Budaya Raya and will give visitors a unique experience. Lee June Ling of The Star said the exhibition allowed visitors "to catch a glimpse" of Siti's illustrious career. Writing for Malaysia Bangkit, Aliyaa Azmi described the exhibition as "a time capsule that brings fans to traverse her illustrious stories". (Note: Original:"[...] satu ‘time capsule’ yang membawa peminat menelusuri kisah kegemilangan beliau.")

== See also ==
- SITI: An Iconic Exhibition of Dato' Siti Nurhaliza
