= Hari Kemenangan =

Single by Siti Nurhaliza
- Released: 20 June 2016
- Recorded: 26 May 2016
- Genre: Islamic; Pop; Hari Raya
- Length: 4:20
- Label: Siti Nurhaliza Productions, Universal Music Malaysia
- Songwriter: Siso Kopratasa
- Producer: Pak Ngah Suhaimi

Siti Nurhaliza singles chronology
"Menatap dalam Mimpi" (2015)	"Hari Kemenangan" (2016)	"Dirgahayu" (2016)

Music video
- "Hari Kemenangan" on YouTube

"Hari Kemenangan" (English: The Day of Victory) is a single by Malaysian artist, Siti Nurhaliza. Written by Siso Kopratasa and produced by Pak Ngah Suhaimi, it was released on 20 June 2016 as a special single for Eid al-Fitr. This single marked her first Eid al-Fitr single after she recorded the last one 10 years ago. It was also produced after Siti release her eid album Anugerah Aidilfitri (The Gift of Eid-al-Fitr) in December 2003.

However, Siti Nurhaliza was accused for plagiarism over the song title having the similarities between it and Rabbani’s song, "Kemenangan" (Victory).

== Background and recording ==
In May 2016, in an interview with Sinar Harian, she revealed that she was going to record and release an Eid al-Fitr song on what has to be known as Hari Kemenangan. She also revealed that this song would be her first Eid al-Fitr in 10 years, and Pak Ngah Suhami would be the song composer. The song was recorded on 26 May 2016, when a one-minute teaser for the recording session was uploaded by Rumpun Records, a subsidiary of Universal Music Group (Malaysia), to their Facebook account. Another 15-second teaser was uploaded by Universal Music Group (Malaysia) to their own Facebook account on the same day. During the recording session, it is said that she took two hours to warm up in the studio after she decided to take a long break from singing after her Dato' Siti Nurhaliza & Friends Concert in April 2016.

== Composition and lyrics ==
A midtempo song, this four minutes and 20 seconds song was produced by Pak Ngah Suhaimi while its lyrics were provided by Siso Kopratasa. Unlike the usual Malaysian Eid al-Fitr songs, the lyrics contain no reference to cliché lines that are synonymous with Eid al-Fitr in Malaysia. The lyrics were described to carry a more meaningful meaning.

According to Siti, "What is special about this Eid al-Fitr song is that we unanimously agree that [we] do not want to incorporate cliché lines like [those that are about] ketupat, lemang, foods, visiting [others], etc., but the lyrics will be heavier but still suitable with the Eid al-Fitr mood". (Note: Original:"Istimewanya lagu raya kali ini, kami sepakat tidak lagi mahu gunakan bait-bait klise seperti ketupat lemang, juadah, bertandang dan sebagainya tetapi liriknya lebih berat namun masih sesuai untuk suasana hari raya.") She also added that "The lyrics of the song are touching the meaning of Eid al-Fitr according to its context in Islam. It tells about the Muslims victory against the nafs during the fasting month, asking for forgiveness from each other and from the One God." (Note: Original:"Lirik lagu itu pun lebih menyentuh maksud Aidilfitri menurut konteks Islam. Ia menceritakan mengenai kemenangan kita umat Islam melawan nafsu pada bulan puasa, memohon keampunan sesama insan dan daripada Yang Maha Esa.") The song is composed with a touch of traditional Malay music that still "retains the elements of [how] the Malays are celebrating the Eid". (Note: Original:"...kekal dengan elemen suasana orang Melayu beraya.")

== Release and promotion ==
The song was made available for download on iTunes Store on 20 June 2016. Its music video was released on Universal Malaysia's official account on 4 July 2016. It was also televised during Salam Aidilfitri, a special Eid al-Fitr program on TV2 and TVi on 5 July 2016.

== Commercial performance ==
In less than a day upon its first release, "Hari Kemenangan" already reached the peak position of the iTunes Malaysia charts.

== Music video ==
The "Hari Kemenangan" official music video was published on Universal Malaysia's official YouTube account on 4 July 2016. It was also later televised on Salam Aidilfitri, a special 2016 Eid al-Fitr television program on 5 July 2016 on TV2 and TVi.

=== Synopsis ===
The music video has a straightforward plot line. It begins with a title card showing her name and the title of the song. It later opens up to a scene where a group of people donning colourful clothes is gathering around a table while interacting with each other. In the next scene, it shows Siti sneaking into the house via the front door much to the surprise of the group of people. In the next part of the video, she is shown to be singing and sitting in the middle between two white couches while being accompanied by Pak Ngah Suhaimi who is playing an accordion while both of them are being watched by other guests. In the next scene she is shown standing with her guests in front of a white bungalow that is decorated with decorative LED lights. Throughout the video, the same indoor and outdoor settings were used repetitively with few intermittent scenes showing the guests and Siti interacting with each other.

== Live performances ==
"Hari Kemenangan" was first performed by Siti Nurhaliza for the public in July 2016 during the official agreement signing between i-Mizu and Siti Nurhaliza Productions on 23 June 2016.

== Controversy ==
In August 2016, Siti was accused for plagiarism and "Hari Kemenangan" was criticized by public due to having a similarities with "Kemenangan" sung by Malaysian nasyid group Rabbani. However, Siti said both songs was composed by Pak Ngah Suhaimi and explains that the similarities of both songs was arise following the misunderstanding between its composer and the singer.

== Track listing ==
Digital download
No.	Title	Writer(s)	Producer(s)	Length
1.	"Hari Kemenangan"	Siso Kopratasa	Pak Ngah Suhaimi	4:20

== Chart performance ==
Chart (2016)	Peak position
Top 30 Singles Chart Malaysia	6

== Release history ==
Country	Date	Format	Label
Malaysia	20 June 2016	Digital download	Siti Nurhaliza Productions, Universal Music Group (Malaysia)

== See also ==
- Anugerah Aidilfitri, an Eid album recorded and released by Siti Nurhaliza in 2003.
- List of songs recorded by Siti Nurhaliza
