= Unplugged (Siti Nurhaliza album) =

Live album by Siti Nurhaliza
- Released: June 30, 2015
- Recorded: January–June, 2015
- Studios: Istana Budaya (Kuala Lumpur); Cranky Music (Petaling Jaya, Selangor); Arteffects Studio (Petaling Jaya, Selangor)
- Genre: Pop
- Labels: Siti Nurhaliza Productions, EMI (Malaysia), Universal Music Group (Malaysia)
- Producers: Siti Nurhaliza (Executive), Mujahid Abdul Wahab (Executive)

Siti Nurhaliza chronology
Konsert Lentera Timur, Panggung Sari Istana Budaya (2014)	Unplugged (2015)	SimetriSiti (2017)

Siti Nurhaliza video chronology
Konsert Lentera Timur, Panggung Sari Istana Budaya (2014)	Unplugged (2015)

Singles from Unplugged
- 1. "Mikraj Cinta" Released: 21 June 2015; 2. "Menatap dalam Mimpi" Released: 2 November 2016

Alternative covers
- CD artwork

Alternative cover
- LP artwork

Unplugged (also known as Dato' Siti Nurhaliza Unplugged) is a live album by Malaysian recording artist Siti Nurhaliza. It was released in multiple formats, both physical and digital in Malaysia on 30 June 2015. The main live tracks were all taken from her 2015 unplugged concert at Istana Budaya on 7 April 2015. The CD, digital download and LP record versions of the album however come with three new bonus songs, "Menatap dalam Mimpi" ("Staring in a Dream"), "Engkau" ("You") and "Mikraj Cinta" ("Ascension of Love"). All were recorded specifically to accompany the three audio releases.

On June 21, 2015, "Mikraj Cinta", one of its bonus tracks was released as an official debut single for the album. On 25 August 2015, another two of Unplugged bonus tracks were nominated for the 2015 Anugerah Planet Muzik. "Menatap dalam Mimpi" is nominated for the category of Best Artiste (Female) while "Engkau" is nominated for the Best Collaboration (Song). On December 18, 2016, Unplugged received four awards from seven nominations from 22nd Anugerah Industri Muzik, including for Best Vocal Performance in a Song (Female), Best Nasyid Song for "Mikraj Cinta", Best Musical Arrangement in a Song for "Menatap dalam Mimpi", and Best Album.

== Background and recording ==
"This is my gift to my fans who have been supporting my career since day one. I don’t think I will be able to be where I am today without the strong support from fans and those around me including family and the media."

— Siti Nurhaliza on recording Unplugged

In the creation process of this record, the main performances are all taken from her one night only 2015 unplugged concert on 7 April 2015. The planning and the execution of the whole live concert took Siti and her team less than three weeks. Although the whole process was done at the eleventh hour, the concert was a success. Held at Istana Budaya, all the tickets sold out days before the concert date and the concert was lauded by critics especially for Siti's vocal performances. The concert also marked her 20th year in the Malaysian music industry ever since she won 1995 Bintang HMI at the age of 16.

The inclusion of bonus tracks to accompany the audio releases of the album was done after the concert. One of the tracks, "Mikraj Cinta" (Ascension of Love), a track written by Hafiz Hamidun and Ahmad Fedtri Yahya was actually first performed live during her performance for "Sirah Rasullulah" (Life of the Messenger of God) on 3, 4 and 7 January 2015 in conjunction with Prophet Muhammad's mawlid. Inspired from the event of Isra and Mi'raj, a violinist from West Asia was hired to provide an original Arabic sound. The remaining two bonus tracks, "Engkau" (You) and "Menatap dalam Mimpi" (Observing in Dream or figuratively Staring in a Dream) were produced by Aubrey Suwito with the lyrics of the two were provided by Ade Govinda and Rozi Sang Dewi respectively. According to Aubrey, he was inspired to produce the melody for "Menatap dalam Mimpi" upon seeing a poem that was uploaded by Rozi on her Twitter account. He completed the whole song in only 20 minutes. Recorded at Aubrey's recording studio, according to Siti, "It possesses the musical elements that require me to diversify the usage of my vocal range. It would not be wrong for me to say, that it is like a musical song that we often heard in films by Walt Disney." (Note: Original:"Ia memiliki elemen muzikal yang memerlukan saya mempelbagaikan penggunaan julat vokal (vokal range) saya. Tidak salah kalau saya katakan, ia seperti sebuah lagu muzikal yang sering kita dengar dalam filem-filem Walt Disney.")

For the iTunes version of the album, two more additional bonus tracks are added, which are essentially the acoustic version of "Menatap dalam Mimpi" and "Engkau". According to Rozi, who is also Siti's personal manager, the two additional tracks are a "bonus to the bonus tracks". (Note: Original:"bonus kpd [sic] bonus track")

== Synopsis ==
The concert began with Siti performing "Membunuh Benci" while accompanied by Aubrey Suwito on piano, who was the musical director for the concert. This was followed by the first medley of the unplugged concert, composed of the first two upbeat songs of the show, "Mahligai Asmara" and "Satu Cinta Dua Jiwa" where she started to dance while singing. She resumed her performance by performing the second medley of the concert composed of "Jawapan di Persimpangan", "Purnama Merindu" and "Diari Hatimu" and followed by another medley composed of "Aku Cinta Padamu" and "Biarlah Rahsia". For the next performance she invited Awi Rafael, the composer of "Mula dan Akhir," to accompany her on guitar while she sang the tune that he composed for her most recent album, Fragmen. Siti returned to upbeat songs in a medley of "Tanpa Kalian" and "Intrig Cinta" before she went to perform another medley of her ballads, "Usah Diragui", "Wajah Kekasih" and "Kau Kekasihku". Before the second half begins, the audience is entertained by the musicians and the background singers who performed "Seindah Biasa".

In the second half of the concert, Siti invited Faizal Tahir to accompany her on guitar while she sang "Aku" and "Warna Dunia", the former of which was composed by Faizal for Fragmen. Later she also invited Dato' Adnan Abu Hassan to accompany her on piano to the songs that were written and composed by him, "Jerat Percintaan" and "Gelora Asmara". She resumed her performance with another three medleys. The first one is a medley of cover songs, "Epilog Cinta dari Bromley" by Sohaimi Mior Hassan and "Suratan Atau Kebetulan" by Kenny, Remy and Martin, followed by a medley of her songs again which was a medley of "Engkau Bagaikan Permata" and "Cahaya Seribu Liku". The final medley of the concert was a medley of three songs from Fragmen that were written by Indonesian songwriters and composers — "Sanubari", "Terbaik Bagimu" and "Kau Sangat Bererti". She finished the show by performing all the songs from Fragmen that were released as singles including "Jaga Dia Untukku", "Lebih Indah" and "Seluruh Cinta".

Throughout the concert she intermittently shared some details from her 20 years' worth of life and singing experiences, from her first recording session to her experiences in recording her latest album, Fragmen. Apart from the three guests artists, she also invited two lucky fans to accompany her on the stage – first before the performance of "Aku Cinta Padamu" and another one before the performance of "Tanpa Kalian".

== Release and promotion ==
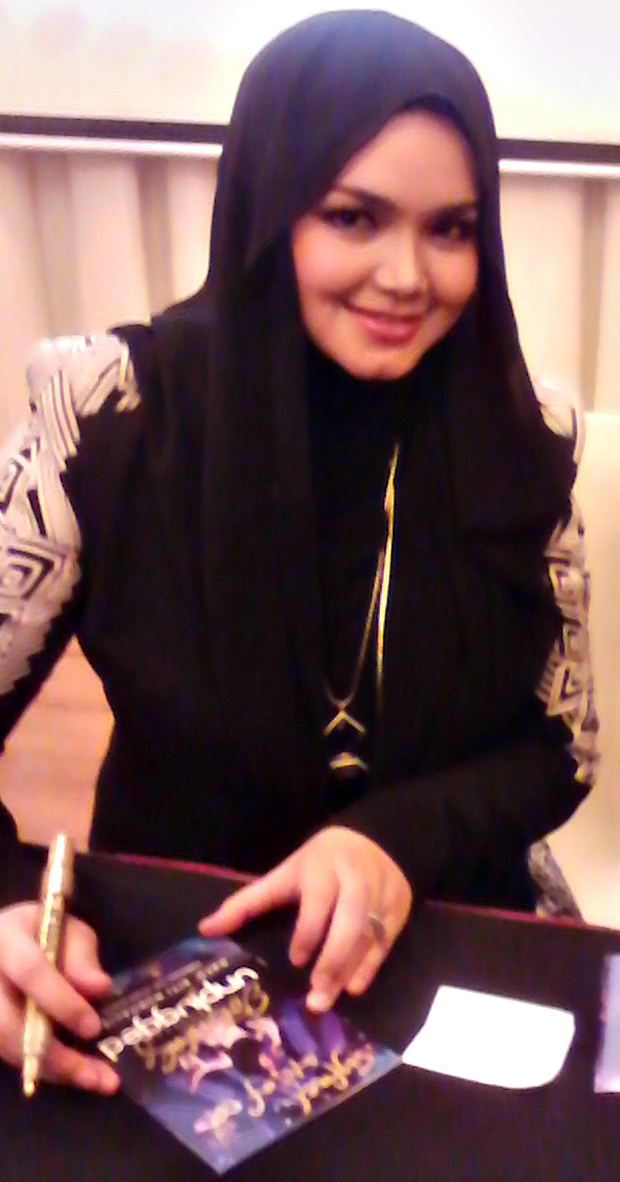
Siti at her meet and greet session in Kuala Lumpur on 13 September 2015.

The album was made available simultaneously for download and stream on various platforms including iTunes, Spotify and Deezer on 30 June 2015. It was officially launched at The Duchess Place, Kuala Lumpur on 2 July 2015. The album also marked her first album to ever be released in the LP record (vinyl) format. She also made an appearance on several television shows to promote the album, including on Wanita Hari Ini (Women Today) on TV3 and Muzik-Muzik, also on TV3.

To help promote the album, three meet and greet sessions were held at three separate locations – Plaza Angsana, Johor Bahru, Johor (29 August), Sunway Carnival Mall, Seberang Jaya, Penang (6 September) and Pavilion, Bukit Bintang, Kuala Lumpur (13 September).

== Commercial performance ==
In less than a day after the album was released to iTunes, it went straight to atop of the charts for three different countries – Malaysia, Singapore and Brunei. For the physical release of the album, 5000 copies were shipped in its first week alone.

== Track listing ==
No.	Title	Writer(s)	Producer(s)	Length
1.	"Membunuh Benci"	Muhammad Ashraf Bin Aasimudin; Hairul Anuar Bin Harun	Aubrey Suwito	4:41
2.	"Medley: Mahligai Asmara & Satu Cinta Dua Jiwa"	Adnan Bin Abu Hassan; Norhani Bte Md Jamil; Azlan Bin Abu Hassan; Ishak Bin Ahmad	Aubrey Suwito	5:10
3.	"Medley: Jawapan di Persimpangan, Purnama Merindu & Diari Hatimu"	Adnan Bin Abu Hassan; Othman Zainuddin; Mohd Azhar Bin Abu Bakar; Lukhman Bin Ab Kadir; Jahi Bin Hasim	Aubrey Suwito	6:23
4.	"Medley: Aku Cinta Padamu & Biarlah Rahsia"	Rozman Bin Shafie; Norkhayati Bte Mohd Hashim; Melly Goeslaw; Siti Nurhaliza Bte Tarudin	Aubrey Suwito	6:00
5.	"Mula & Akhir"	Awi Rafael; Tinta S	Aubrey Suwito	5:03
6.	"Medley: Intrig Cinta & Tanpa Kalian"	Siti Nurhaliza Bte Tarudin; Rosli Bin Khamis; Mujahid Bin Haji Abdul Wahab	Aubrey Suwito	5:23
7.	"Medley: Usah Diragui, Wajah Kekasih & Kau Kekasihku"	Zulkifli Bin Mahat; Habsah Bte Hassan; Adnan Bin Abu Hassan; Norhani Bte Md Jamil; Mohd Faizal Bin Maas; Rohayah Bte Daud	Aubrey Suwito	7:28
8.	"Medley: Aku & Warna Dunia"	Michael Chan Wai Keong; Ahmad Faizal Bin Mohd Tahir; Lin Li Zhen; Rozi Sang Dewi	Aubrey Suwito	6:51
9.	"Medley: Jerat Percintaan & Gelora Asmara"	Adnan Abu Hassan; Othman Zainuddin; Norhani Bte Mohd Jamil; Adnan Bin Abu Hassan; Faridah Bte Abdul Razak	Aubrey Suwito	6:31
10.	"Medley: Epilog Cinta dari Bromley & Suratan atau Kebetulan"	Sohaimi Bin Mior Hassan; Tay Chia Tau; Habsah Bte Hassan	Aubrey Suwito	4:59
11.	"Medley: Engkau Bagaikan Permata & Cahaya Seribu Liku"	Helen Yap Yu Pit; Siti Nurhaliza Bte Tarudin; Shamsuddin Bin Amir Hussain; Andy Flop Poppy; Siti Nurhaliza Bte Tarudin; Tanty	Aubrey Suwito	4:53
12.	"Medley: Sanubari, Terbaik Bagimu & Kau Sangat Bererti"	Adi Priyo Sambodo; Ce Kem; Ade Govinda; Hamid Mufari	Aubrey Suwito	8:30
13.	"Jaga Dia Untukku"	Aubrey Suwito; Rozi Sang Dewi	Aubrey Suwito	3:48
14.	"Lebih Indah"	Aubrey Suwito; Ad Samad	Aubrey Suwito	5:46
15.	"Seluruh Cinta"	Krishna Balagita	Aubrey Suwito	4:17
Total length:				1:25:43

CD bonus tracks
No.	Title	Writer(s)	Producer(s)	Length
16.	"Menatap dalam Mimpi"	Aubrey Suwito; Rozi Sang Dewi	Aubrey Suwito	4:58
17.	"Engkau"	Ade Govinda	Aubrey Suwito	4:37
18.	"Mikraj Cinta"	Fedtri Yahya; Hafiz Hamidun	Hafiz Hamidun	4:37
Total length:				14:12

iTunes bonus tracks
No.	Title	Writer(s)	Producer(s)	Length
19.	"Menatap dalam Mimpi" (Acoustic)	Aubrey Suwito; Rozi Sang Dewi	Aubrey Suwito	4:37
20.	"Engkau" (Acoustic)	Ade Govinda	Aubrey Suwito	4:37
Total length:				9:14

== Personnel ==
Credits adapted from Unplugged booklet liner notes.

=== Main concert ===
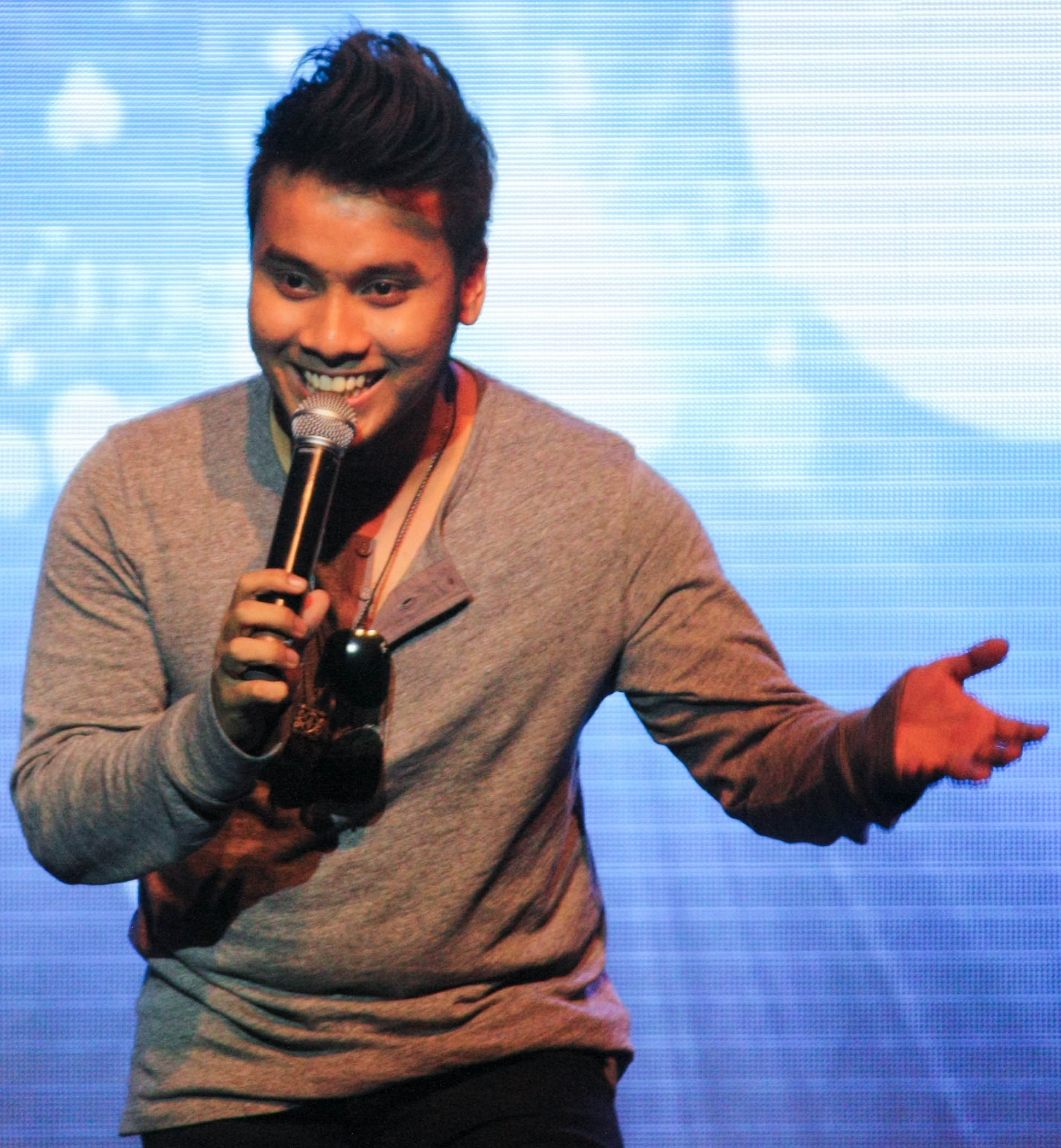
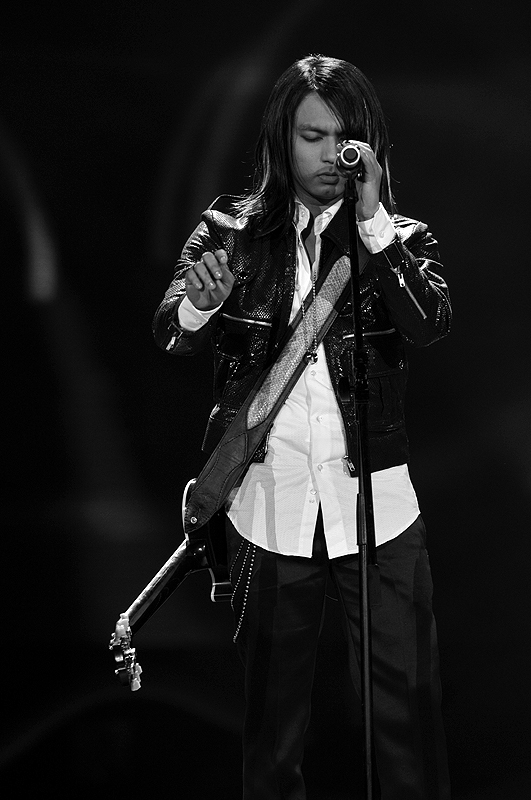
Awi Rafael (left) and Faizal Tahir (right) are two of the guest artists that accompanied Siti during the concert when she was singing the songs that they composed for Fragmen.
- Adzwa – dance instructor
- Alud @ Khairul Azmir Abdul Hamid – concert manager, concert administrator
- Aniza – dancer
- Aubrey Suwito – musical director, post production, arrangement, piano
- Awi Rafael – guest artist
- Chandelier Trust Lighting Collection – sponsor
- Dato' Adnan Abu Hassan – guest artist
- Dato' Mohamed Juhari Shaarani – adviser
- Dato' Siti Nurhaliza – executive producer, vocals
- Derrick Siow – drums
- Fadzliana – dancer
- Faizal Tahir – guest artist
- Fara Wahida – dancer
- Firdaus Dalip – monitor engineer
- 'Fly' Halizor Hussein – electric bass, upright bass
- Joel Voo – acoustic guitar
- Juanita – background vocals
- Lentera Creative Home – sponsor
- Lim Jae Sern – violin
- Marina – dancer
- Miela @ Norfazilah Abu Seman – management/production
- Mohd Azli Othman – compere
- Mohd Rafi Shafie – acoustic guitar
- Moke Printing – sponsor
- Nur Iman @ Aiman – production manager
- Nurul Shuhada – dancer
- Nurul Shukor – make-up artist
- Ozlan Othman – lighting director
- Paradigm Studio – photography
- Rizman Ruzaini – wardrobe designer, sponsor
- Rozi Abdul Razak – idea, concept, script, coordinator
- Shaun Paiva – assistant sound engineer/recording,
- Siti Norsaida Tarudin – management/production
- Steve Thornton – percussion
- Sunil Kumar – sound engineer/recording, mixing
- Syaiful Rasyidi @ Ad – technical director
- Widy – background vocals
- Zaramiz Sdn. Bhd. – sponsor

=== Istana Budaya workforce ===
Production

- Mohd Azli Othman – production
- Mohd Ferdaus Hassan – production
- Rozita Ismail – production
- Suhaimi Abdul Rahim – production

Management

- Azhar Mohamad – management
- Harttzery Nazry Hatta – management
- Kamarulanuar Ismail – management
- M Ramlee Hj Ismail – management
- Mohd Ridhuan Wan Mohd Zin – management
- Mohd Yusoff Bokhri – management

Audiovisual unit

- Hakimi Mohd Zain – audiovisual unit
- Jafri Hasan – audiovisual unit
- Mohamad Yusri Zain – audiovisual unit
- Mohd Zunohan Md Noor – audiovisual unit
- Mohd Zul'amri Amran – audiovisual unit
- Muhamad Fadzli Ramli – audiovisual unit

Stage management

- Anuar Mohamad Kassim – stage management
- Azrulnizam Aziz – stage management
- Barat Anak Echan – stage management
- Mohd Anuar Zakaria – stage management
- Mohd Sujak Othman – stage management
- Mohd Sufri Mohamad – stage management
- Sha'ari Hashin – stage management
- Yuzaidi Md Yusuf – stage management

Art and design

- Abdul Razak Abdol Rahim – art and design
- Mohd Azali Idris – art and design
- Mohd Khairul Adnan Khalid – art and design
- Rudy Efendy Jammakhir – art and design
- Sazali Ismail – art and design

Technical

- Ahmad Ruzaini Bin Mohd Sharif
- Ahmad Tarmizi Muhammad
- Amir Bin Abu
- Amir Husni Bin Hamidun
- Azhari Bin Abdul Rashid
- Azli Bin Baharuddin
- Azri Bin Seman
- Azzazial Bin Shuib
- Fareez Bin Sadikon
- Ilmi Bin Cek Hamid
- Ismail B. Mohammad
- Khairul Aizat Bin Alias
- Khairul Anuar Bin Jaafar
- Maharini Binti Bidin
- Mat Nuri Bin Mat Ali
- Mohammad Fairolnizam Bin Ali Othman
- Mohammad Faizal Bin Hj. Hamid
- Mohammed Herman Bin Majid
- Mohd Alizar Bin Sulaiman
- Mohd Fyrulnizam Bin Mohd Yusof
- Mohd Halimi Bin Hassan
- Mohd Nizam Abu Bakar
- Mohd Nizam B. Bakar
- Mohd Rizal Bin Johari @ Razak
- Mohd Yusoff Bin Kassim
- Muhammad Zaki Bin Abu Samah
- Nik Mohd Fadzir Bin Nik Ismail
- Osmar Bin Fariez
- Salleh Bin Muhammad
- Suzahani Bin Shuib
- Tines Kumar A/L Murugasu
- Wan Ayubee B. Wan Razoly
- Wan Mohd Azam Bin Wan Ishak
- Wan Zahari Bin Wan Ismail
- Zulkeflee Bin Husin

Front of House

- Abdul Malik Bin Osman
- Ahmad Jamri Bin Jamaluddin
- Aniza Bt. Baharom
- Azman Bin Abu Bakar
- Azrita Aida Bt. Abdul Aziz
- Boniface Anak Babai
- Fauziah Hanim Bt. Mohd. Zain
- Halimattun Bt. Mohd Nor
- Hamdan Bin Awang
- Hanipah Bt. Hairi
- Hasnul Bin Hassan
- Jailani Bin Abdul Razak
- Marina Mary Charles
- Md Firdaus Bin Alias
- Mohamad Nizam Bin Elias
- Mohd Aizat Bin Rusly
- Norhashimah Bt. Leman
- Nor Haslinda Bt. Abdul Manaf
- Nor Zulzaliana Bt. Yahya
- Nurul Wahida Bt. Zulkifli
- Roslinah Bt. Haroun
- Roszilawati Bt. Abd Rahim
- Rudy De Luna Jr
- Saniah Bt. Aziz
- Siti Norhabsah Bt. Syeikh Ahmad
- Siti Sarah Bt. Abdul Kalam
- Syaira Dalina Bt. Abdullah
- Zamri Bin Mohamad

=== Album ===
Performers and musicians

- Ade Govinda – composer (track 17), lyricist (track 17)
- Aji – guitar (track 16, 17)
- Aksana Yupusova – violin (track 16, 17)
- Alla Yanisheva – violin (track 16, 17)
- Aubrey Suwito – composer (track 16), production (track 16, 17), arrangement (track 16, 17), music programming (track 16, 17)
- Brian Larson – violin (track 16, 17)
- Dato' Siti Nurhaliza – vocals (track 1–18)
- Emre Moğulkoç – strings (track 18)
- Fedtri Yahya – lyricist (track 18)
- Florian Antier – cello (track 16, 17)
- Greg Henderson – mixing (track 18)
- Hafiz Hamidun – composer (track 18), lyricist (track 18), arrangement (track 18), background vocals (track 18)
- Jae Sern Lim – violin (track 16, 17)
- Jay Franco (Sterling Sound) – mastering (track 1–18)
- Kelly – bass (track 18)
- Nasran Nawi – cello (track 16, 17)
- Rozi Sang Dewi – lyricist (track 16)
- Sunil Kumar – mixing (track 1–17)
- Toko Inomoto – viola (track 16, 17)
- Veronika Thoene – viola (track 16, 17)
- Wan Saleh – music programming (track 18)
- Yap Yen – violin (track 16, 17)
- Zul Visa – guitar (track 18)

Technical Personnel

- Dato' Siti Nurhaliza – executive producer
- Elaine – promotional unit (Universal Music Group)
- Fiffy – promotional unit (Universal Music Group)
- Idiaz Ismail – creation
- Kamal – promotional unit (Universal Music Group)
- Mujahid Abdul Wahab – executive producer
- Nino – artist and repertoire
- Niza Nor – creation
- Nurul Shukor (Nurul Shukor Touch) – make-up
- Rizman Ruzaini – wardrobe
- Rozi Abdul Razak – promotional unit (Siti Nurhaliza Productions)
- Sander – promotional unit (Universal Music Group)
- Syamir – promotional unit (Universal Music Group)
- WANPA – wardrobe
- Zepi – promotional unit (Universal Music Group)

== Awards ==
=== Anugerah Planet Muzik ===
On 25 August 2015, two of Unplugged bonus tracks were nominated for the 2015 Anugerah Planet Muzik, an award ceremony that involves musicians and artists from Indonesia, Malaysia and Singapore. "Menatap dalam Mimpi" is nominated for the category of Best Artiste (Female) while "Engkau" is nominated for the Best Collaboration (Song).

Year	Award	Recipients and nominees	Category	Result	Host country
2015	Anugerah Planet Muzik	"Engkau"	Best Collaboration (Song)	Nominated	Singapore
2015	Anugerah Planet Muzik	"Menatap dalam Mimpi"	Best Artiste (Female)	Nominated	Singapore

=== Anugerah Industri Muzik ===
On 13 October 2016, Unplugged received seven nominations for six categories from 22nd Anugerah Industri Muzik (AIM 22). Two of its bonus tracks received four nominations - "Menatap dalam Mimpi" is nominated for Best Vocal Performance in a Song (Female), Best Musical Arrangement in a Song, and Best Pop Song while "Mikraj Cinta" is nominated for Best Nasyid Song. The live version of "Jaga Dia Untukku" that was performed at the concert also received the nomination for the Best Musical Arrangement in a Song.

Unplugged on its own received multiple nominations, including for the Best Engineered Album and Best Album. During the award ceremony, she received five awards, including fan-voted Choice Malaysian Singer. AIM 22 also marked her 13th time winning Best Vocal Performance and fifth time winning the Best Album category.

Year	Award	Recipients and nominees	Category	Result	Host country
2016	Anugerah Industri Muzik	"Jaga Dia Untukku" (Live from Unplugged)	Best Musical Arrangement in a Song	Nominated	Malaysia
2016	Anugerah Industri Muzik	"Mikraj Cinta"	Best Nasyid Song	Won	Malaysia
2016	Anugerah Industri Muzik	"Menatap dalam Mimpi"	Best Vocal Performance in a Song (Female)	Won	Malaysia
2016	Anugerah Industri Muzik	"Menatap dalam Mimpi"	Best Pop Song	Nominated	Malaysia
2016	Anugerah Industri Muzik	"Menatap dalam Mimpi"	Best Musical Arrangement in a Song	Won	Malaysia
2016	Anugerah Industri Muzik	Unplugged	Best Engineered Album	Nominated	Malaysia
2016	Anugerah Industri Muzik	Unplugged	Best Album	Won	Malaysia

== Release history ==
Region	Date	Format	Label
Malaysia	30 June 2015	CD, VCD, DVD, digital download	Siti Nurhaliza Productions, EMI (Malaysia), Universal Music Group (Malaysia)
Malaysia	September 2015	LP record	Siti Nurhaliza Productions, EMI (Malaysia), Universal Music Group (Malaysia)
Japan	19 September 2015	CD	Universal Music Group

== See also ==
- Dato' Siti Nurhaliza Unplugged 2015
