= Mikraj Cinta =

Single by Siti Nurhaliza

from the album Unplugged
- Released: 21 June 2015
- Recorded: 18 May 2015; Arteffects International; (Petaling Jaya, Selangor)
- Genre: Islamic; Pop
- Length: 4:37
- Label: Siti Nurhaliza Productions, Universal Music Group (Malaysia)
- Songwriters: Hafiz Hamidun, Fedtri Yahya
- Producer: Hafiz Hamidun

Siti Nurhaliza singles chronology
"Seluruh Cinta" (2014)	"Mikraj Cinta" (2015)	"Menatap dalam Mimpi" (2015)

Music video
- "Mikraj Cinta" on YouTube

"Mikraj Cinta" (Ascension of Love) is a single by Malaysian artist, Siti Nurhaliza. It was released on 21 June 2015 as the lead single from her live album, Unplugged. Composed by Hafiz Hamidun and Fedtri Yahya, the song is included in the album as one of the bonus tracks. Originally a song by Hafiz for himself, it was given to Siti for her performance of "Sirah Rasullulah" (Life of the Messenger of God) in conjunction with Prophet Muhammad's mawlid on 3, 4 and 7 January 2015. The studio version of the song was later included to accompany the release of Unplugged.

Its music video, directed by Zuli and Aloi first premiered on HLive on Astro Ria on 10 July 2015 before being officially released on YouTube on 14 July 2015.

On December 18, 2016, "Mikraj Cinta" won the Best Nasyid Song category at the 22nd Anugerah Industri Muzik.

== Background and recording ==
Prior to its official release as a single, it was first performed by Siti during the theater of "Sirah Rasullulah" (Life of the Messenger of God) in conjunction with Prophet Muhammad's mawlid on 3, 4 and 7 January 2015 at Istana Budaya. However, Hafiz Hamidun, one of the lyricists and the sole composer for this song first performed this song back on 24 May 2014 for "Konsert Mikraj Cinta" before deciding to give the song to Siti for her special performance for "Sirah Rasullulah". "Mikraj Cinta" later was officially recorded as a song on 18 May 2015 at Hafiz's own recording studio, Arteffects International. Inspired from the event of Isra and Mi'raj, a violinist from West Asia was hired to provide an original Arabic sound to the song.

== Composition and lyrics ==
A midtempo song, the music is inspired by Arabic music where a West Asian violinist was hired to provide a true Arabic sounding tune to the whole song composition. Composed by Hafiz Hamidun the lyrics to the song was provided by Hafiz and Fedtri Yahya. Described as an "Islamic spiritual" song, the song spans for four minutes and thirty seven seconds. Inspired from the story of Prophet Muhammad's journey during the event of Isra and Mi'raj, according to Siti, the song was later reworked so that it can also be translated as "universal love and going back to the one true God". (Note: Original:"...cinta yang bersifat universal dan kembali kepada Tuhan Yang Maha Esa.")

== Release and promotion ==
First performed live during the play of "Sirah Rasullulah" 3, 4 and 7 January 2015 at Istana Budaya, it was later performed again for the recording of her special show for Eid al-Fitr which was aired on TV1 on 17 July 2015. Teasers for the release of "Mikraj Cinta" as a single from the Unplugged album were first uploaded by Rumpun Records' YouTube account (a subsidiary of Universal Music Malaysia) on 17 June. The release of "Mikraj Cinta" as a single is marked with the release of its lyric video on the same account on 21 June 2015.

== Music video ==
=== Background ===
Directed by Zuli and Aloi, Siti's scenes were recorded at the Open Deck of Kuala Lumpur Tower (KL Tower) on 23 June 2015. Dressed in a white dress designed by Ezuwan Ismail, the music video was first previewed for the media at the launch of Unplugged at The Duchess Place, Kuala Lumpur on 2 July 2015. A 15-second teaser of the music video was first uploaded by Siti on her Instagram account on 28 June 2015. On 10 July 2015, the music video premiered on HLive on Astro Ria and later released for public streaming on YouTube on 14 July 2015.

A behind-the-scene for "Mikraj Cinta"'s music video was also released on the same date.

=== Synopsis ===
In the first frame, it shows Siti in a white dress on the Open Deck of KL Tower with Petronas Twin Towers visible in the background. In the second frame, it shows the two women with the two picture frames on their right.

The music video can be divided into two main parts — scenes which Siti is all by herself and another one where there is a story line acted by few actors and actresses. The music video begins with a bird's-eye view of KL Tower before slowly zooming in to show where Siti stands on the Open Deck of the tower. Throughout the music video, scenes involving Siti vary in term of camera angle, from aerial shot, bird's eye shot, long shot, medium shot to close-up. Many of the scenes with aerial shot, bird's eye shot and long shot, aerial drones were employed to film.

For the story line part of the video, it begins with a scene of a car with a family of three (parents and their son) and another one with a young woman (played by Janna Nick) who was taking a selfie and texting while driving. While the young woman was busy texting, she lost her focus before crashing into the first car with the family from the opposite direction. In the next scene, a headline of a newspaper indicating two deaths from the family car was shown, followed by a scene showing the young woman crying in a prison. Although the older woman was shown to survive the car accident, she became blind.

In the next scene, the young woman was shown to be repenting and after her release from the prison, she started to try establish a relationship with the older woman. Although her first try of introducing herself was rejected, she was shown to repeatedly try to help the blind older woman several times including hanging a take-out on the older woman's door grill and sneaking into the older woman's house to help her out. In one of the last scenes, the younger woman was showing to be attending to the older woman when the latter fell sick. The older women, realizing how much the younger woman was trying to help her was shown to be hugging the young woman out of forgiveness and appreciation. In the last scene, the younger woman was showing to be helping the older woman to eat while on their right, two framed pictures were shown. The first one with the older woman and her husband and her son, while in the second, the older woman with the younger woman.

The music video ends with a scene that is slowly zooming out showing a long shot of Siti and later the upper part of the Open Deck of KL Tower.

== Live performances ==
First performed as part of the performances for "Sirah Rasullulah" on 3, 4 and 7 January 2015 at Istana Budaya, the song was later performed at the recording of her special show for Eid al-Fitr, "Lebih Indah bersama Siti Nurhaliza" at Angkasapuri on 28 May 2015. She also performed "Mikraj Cinta" at the launch of Unplugged at The Duchess Place, Kuala Lumpur on 2 July 2015.

== Track listing ==
Digital download
No.	Title	Writer(s)	Producer(s)	Length
1.	"Mikraj Cinta"	Fedtri Yahya, Hafiz Hamidun	Hafiz Hamidun	4:37
2.	"Mikraj Cinta (Behind the Scene)" (video)		AB Roll	2:19
Total length:				6:56

== Credits and personnel ==
Credits adapted from Unplugged booklet liner notes.

- Dato' Siti Nurhaliza – vocals
- Emre Moğulkoç – strings
- Fedtri Yahya – lyricist
- Greg Henderson – mixing
- Hafiz Hamidun – composer, lyricist, arrangement, background vocals
- Jay Franco (Sterling Sound) – mastering
- Kelly – bass
- Wan Saleh – music programming
- Zul Visa – guitar

== Chart performance ==
Chart (2015)	Peak position
Top 30 Singles Chart Malaysia	25

== Release history ==
Country	Date	Format	Label
Malaysia	21 June 2015	Digital download	Siti Nurhaliza Productions, Universal Music Group (Malaysia), EMI (Malaysia)

== Awards ==
=== Anugerah Industri Muzik ===
Year	Nominated work	Category	Result
2016	"Mikraj Cinta"	Best Nasyid Song	Won

== Cover version ==
In 2019, Asian-American singer Nadya Sudjaja released her rendition of "Mikraj Cinta" under US Music Label Fractal Efekt Media. Nadya performed her rendition before Islamic dignitaries in Miami, Florida, USA in celebration of Eid al-Fitr; the conclusion of Ramadan.
