= Dirgahayu =

2016 single by Faizal Tahir and Siti Nurhaliza

Single by Faizal Tahir and Siti Nurhaliza

from the album Anatomi
- Released: 12 August 2016
- Recorded: June–July 2016
- Genre: Power ballad
- Length: 3:29
- Label: Warner Music Group (Malaysia); Faithful Music; Universal Music Group (Malaysia); Siti Nurhaliza Productions
- Songwriters: Faizal Tahir; Mike Chan; Ezra Kong

Faizal Tahir singles chronology
| "Sejati" (2016) | "Dirgahayu" (2016) | "Bukan Yang Pertama" (2017) |

Siti Nurhaliza singles chronology
| "Hari Kemenangan" (2016) | "Dirgahayu" (2016) | "Memories" (2016) |

"Dirgahayu" (Note: According to Kamus Dewan published by Dewan Bahasa dan Pustaka, Dirgahayu is a royal palace language which means "mudah-mudahan" or "semoga lanjut usia" (long life, majesty and dominion).) (Perpetuity) is a duet single by Malaysian artists, Faizal Tahir and Siti Nurhaliza, released on 12 August 2016. It was released to serve as a theme song for a 100-episode Malaysian television series, Lara Aishah. Co-written by Faizal himself, it was recorded in July 2016 before it was released a month later.

On 22 August 2016, a lyric video for the song featuring clips from Lara Aishah was published on Faizal's official YouTube account. This song was later included as a bonus track on Faizal's fourth studio album, Anatomi (Anatomy) which was released on 4 November 2016. It was performed live by the duo at the 22nd Anugerah Industri Muzik on 18 December 2016 with its official music video premiering in the background as the backdrop for the live performance. On 19 December 2016, "Dirgahayu"'s music video was uploaded and published on YouTube.

== Background and recording ==
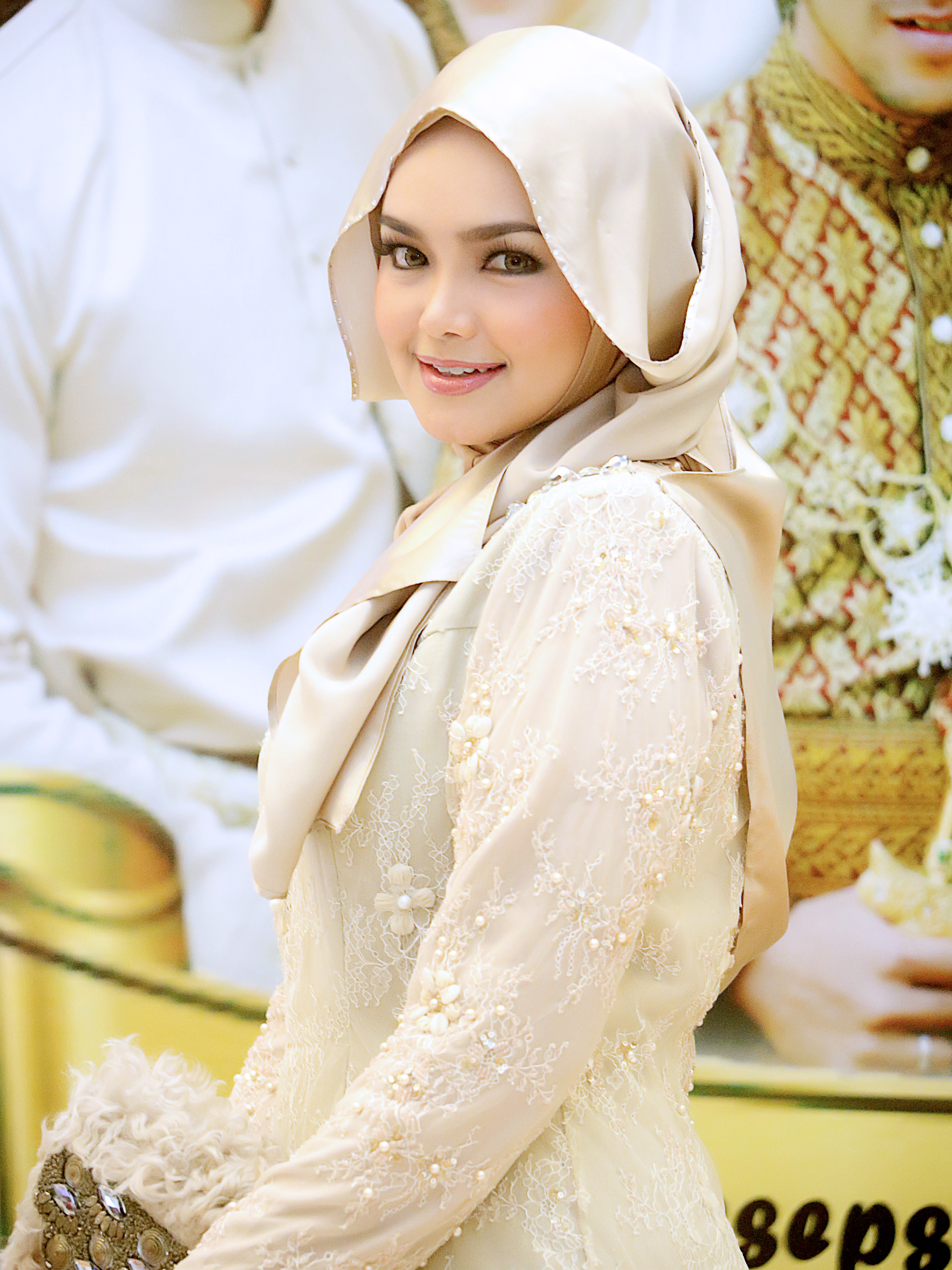
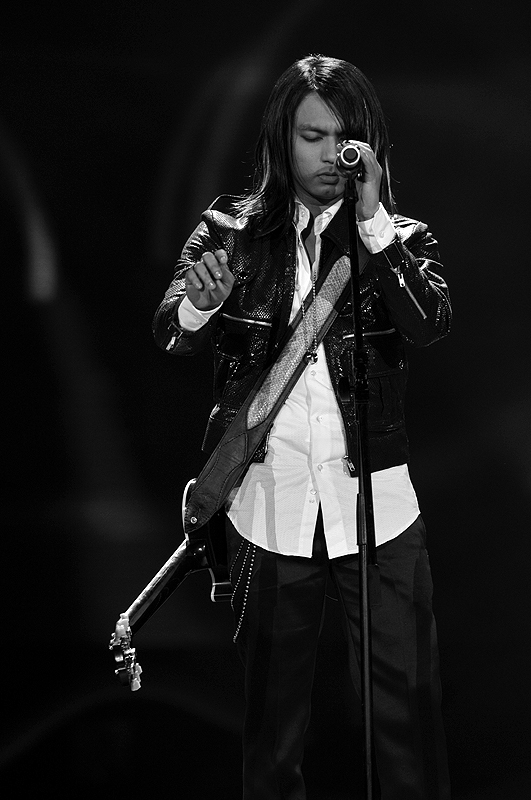
"Dirgahayu" marked the first time for Siti Nurhaliza and Faizal Tahir (right) to record a song together.

The news about the recording arose when Faizal Tahir talked about it at his iAMFAITHMEN's Eid al-Fitr open house at The Gardens in Mid Valley on 20 July 2016. Originally meant to be mentioned briefly in the interview, Faizal decided to tell the media all about his project with Siti Nurhaliza. During the interview, he revealed that the song just finished recording a week before.

The whole duet project began when he was approached by Datin Zaiton Mohamad Jiwa, owner of Global Station. She offered him a chance to produce and record a duet with Siti Nurhaliza for her production house's latest television series, Lara Aishah. Upon receiving the offer, Faizal immediately worked on the song during the Islamic month of Ramadan. Siti and Faizal recorded their vocals separately since at the time of Faizal's recording, Siti was in Mecca to perform the Umrah. Fully composed by Mike Chan, Ezra Kong, and Faizal himself, Faizal recorded his part during Ramadan while Siti recorded her part after Eid al-Fitr. Faizal commented: "Dirgahayu is fully composed by myself and two friends of mine which are Mike Chan and Ezra Kong. Actually, before this people have been asking for Datuk Siti Nurhaliza and I to work together. By happenstance, the production company, Global Station Sdn Bhd proposed to me to compose a song with her for a 100-episode drama series for Astro." (Note: Original:"Lagu Dirgahayu adalah ciptaan sepenuhnya oleh saya serta dua orang rakan yang lain iaitu Mike Chan dan Ezra Kong. Sebenarnya sebelum ini memang ramai yang buat permintaan mahu saya dan Datuk Siti Nurhaliza bekerjasama. Kebetulan syarikat produksi Global Station Sdn Bhd melamar saya untuk hasilkan lagu duet bersama beliau untuk drama bersiri seratus episod di Astro.")

"Dirgahayu" marked their first effort to record a song together. Previously, they had worked together on a number of occasions including Konsert Satu Suara, a concert for Faizal Tahir in 2010 which was sponsored and produced by Siti Nurhaliza's own production company, Siti Nurhaliza Productions. He also composed and produced "Aku", one of the songs that was included in Fragmen, an album by Siti Nurhaliza which was released in 2014. He also has served as guest artist for a number of Siti Nurhaliza's concerts, including Dato' Siti Nurhaliza Unplugged 2015 concert and Dato' Siti Nurhaliza & Friends Concert in April 2016.

== Composition and lyrics ==
A power ballad song, the song lasts for three minutes and twenty nine seconds. The song is fully composed and produced by Ezra Kong, Mike Chan, and Faizal Tahir himself. The song serves as the theme song for Lara Aishah, a 100-episode Malaysian adaptation of Mexican telenovela, La Loba.

== Release and promotion ==
"Dirgahayu" was first performed live at Rumah Terbuka Sesuci Lebaran, an Eid al-Fitr open house by Siti Nurhaliza on 31 July 2016 at JW Marriott Kuala Lumpur. The song was officially released digitally on 12 August 2016, followed by the release of its official lyric video on 22 August 2016.

This song was later included as a bonus track on Faizal's fourth studio album, Anatomi (Anatomy) which was released on 4 November 2016. On 18 December, the duo performed "Dirgahayu" during the 22nd Anugerah Industri Muzik with its official music video premiered as the backdrop for the performance.

== Music video ==
=== Background and release ===
The music video was recorded on 3 December 2016 at the Kuala Lumpur Railway Station. It was directed by Syahir Ismail and produced by Lokalab. During the shoot, she wore a red flowy dress designed by Ezuwan Ismail while her makeup was provided by Epie Temerloh. The music video premiered at the 22nd Anugerah Industri Muzik as the backdrop during the live performance of "Dirgahayu" by Siti and Faizal on 18 December 2016. It was later uploaded and published on Faizal's official YouTube account on the next day.

=== Synopsis ===
"Dirgahayu"'s music video begins with a half minute monologue between Siti and Faizal. During the monologue, Siti was shown walking outside and inside of the Kuala Lumpur Railway Station building in a flowy red dress and hijab while Faizal walked downstairs in a white tuxedo and a pair of black Ray-Ban teashades sunglasses.

Throughout the music video, although both Siti and Faizal were using the same outdoor and indoor locations, for most of the scenes, they were not in the same shot. Only during the latter half of the music video they were shown in the same scene. Occasionally, scenes showing Faizal playing a black piano with dry leaves strewing on top of the piano and around him were shown intermittently.

== Chart performance ==
| Chart (2017) | Peak position |
|---|---|
| Top 10 Domestic Singles (RIM) | 4 |

== Format and track listing ==
- Digital download
1. "Dirgahayu" – 3:29

== Explanatory notes ==
Additional explanatory notes
