= SITI: An Iconic Exhibition of Dato' Siti Nurhaliza =

2014 exhibition of paintings

- Venue: Artelier Gallery, Publika, Kuala Lumpur, Malaysia
- Date(s): 27 February – 26 March 2014
- Theme: Siti Nurhaliza
- Type: Free public admission
- Artists: Adrian Torres, Amirfirdaus Tarmizi, Arikwibowo Amril, Azizi Latif, Badruddin Syah Abdul Wahab, E. M. Nightwatcher, Faiz Yunus, Muhammad Firdaus Mahadi, Haafiz Shahimi, Haffendi Anuar, Khairul Arshad, Muhammad Syahbandi Samat, Nazmi Ismail, Sabihis Md. Pandi, Scott & Dhameer Abbas, Shafiq Nordin, Zizan Rozman

SITI: An Iconic Exhibition of Dato' Siti Nurhaliza was a month-long fundraising exhibition of paintings and artworks that were inspired by the achievements made by Malaysian recording artist, Siti Nurhaliza. With 17 artworks from 15 Malaysian, one Spanish and one Iranian artists, the show was one of the events that is a part of Siti Nurhaliza's effort to raise funds for her foundation, Yayasan Nurjiwa. The artworks showcased range from paintings, sculptures, calligraphies, new media arts, stencil arts and mixed media arts. The exhibition is among the first of its kind in Malaysia where the main subject of the exhibition is a pop star.

Launched on 27 February, the gallery was opened to public until 26 March 2014.

== Background and development ==
"It's our first venture into a public initiative to bridge the world of performing arts and fine arts by creating Malaysia's first female pop icon in the art industry — Siti."

— Ahmad Khairo Othman, Artelier Gallery owner

The project was a collaboration between Artelier Gallery and Siti Nurhaliza Productions as a fundraiser for Yayasan Nurjiwa, a charity foundation founded by Siti and her husband, Datuk Khalid Mohd Jiwa. The exhibition is a continuation of Siti's effort to raise funds for her foundation after her January 2014 concert, Dato Siti Nurhaliza Live in Concert - Where the Heart is. Another objective of the exhibition was also to bring the public closer to the fine arts, through Siti Nurhaliza, a Malaysian icon.

The exhibition project began several months earlier, when Artelier Gallery started to scout for potential artists who have different approaches in producing their own artworks. Overall, 17 artists were finally selected to participate in the art exhibition - 15 Malaysians, one Spanish and one Iranian. Once the artists have been chosen, each of them was given a chance to personally meet and interview Siti before starting to produce their own artworks based on their takes on Siti. Based on the artists' medium of preference, the artworks exhibited range in style - paintings, sculptures, calligraphies, new media arts, stencil arts and mixed media arts.

All paintings that were showcased were up for sale, ranging in price, from RM 1 500 to RM 75 000 apiece. As much as 30 percent of total sales grossed from the paintings that have been sold will be channelled to Yayasan Nurjiwa.

The exhibition is among the first of its kind in Malaysia, in which the sole main subject is a pop star.

== Artworks ==
Amongst the known artworks exhibited are:

Artist	Title	Type	Description/Notes
Adrian Torres		Painting	A finger painting that was completed in three weeks, where it shows a close up of Siti in a blue dress. At the exhibition, it was the most expensive piece showcased, valued at RM 75 000.
Muhammad Syahbandi Samat	"Feel The Dark, See The Light"	Painting	"It's entirely drawn and coloured by ball pens and took me two weeks to complete. It's based on two photos of her, one with a black background and white headdress and the other with a white background and black headdress."
Nazmi Ismail	"Malaysian Diva" and "The Great Singer"	Spray Painting	Depiction of Siti in two different headdresses by application of spray paints onto canvases. According to Nazmi, "I got the idea to produce this artwork after [I] watched several of her music video clips over the Internet. Once I got the image, only then I translated it in the form of painting." (Note: Original: "Saya mendapat idea untuk menghasilkan lukisan ini selepas menonton beberapa klip video lagu beliau di internet. Setelah mendapat gambaran imej, baru saya menterjemahkannya ke dalam bentuk lukisan")
Sabihis Md. Pandi	"The Siti"	Mixed media art	A 119 cm x 132 cm painting that was completed in only two weeks. According to Sabihis, "It's a poster with a disco-like feel. It's lots of geometrical shapes forming a huge circle around a stylish portrait of Siti. The message is that she is a superstar."
Scott Abbas	"Simply Siti"	Sculpture	A bust depicting the lower half of Siti's face. According to Scott, "It's titled Simply Siti and it's inspired by Hollywood busts of stars." At the exhibition, it was valued at RM 6 500.
Shafiq Nordin	"Dreams Come True"	Mixed media art	Completed in two weeks, it depicts Siti inside an aircraft that advertises her own line of cosmetics, SimplySiti. According to Shafiq, "Siti is a true Malaysian success story, that's what my art depicts. She reminds all of us that we should always have a dream and work hard towards achieving that dream."
Zizan Rosman	"Beauty Is In The Eyes Of The Beholder"		A close up of Siti, with quotes from thinkers and writers in the background including that was made by Albert Einstein. The artwork symbolises the life and examples made by Siti.

== Artists ==
- Adrian Torres, Spain
- Amirfirdaus Tarmizi, Malaysia
- Arikwibowo Amril, Malaysia
- Azizi Latif, Malaysia
- Badruddin Syah Abdul Wahab, Malaysia
- E. M. Nightwatcher, Iran
- Faiz Yunus, Malaysia
- Muhammad Firdaus Mahadi, Malaysia
- Haafiz Shahimi, Malaysia
- Haffendi Anuar, Malaysia
- Khairul Arshad, Malaysia
- Muhammad Syahbandi Samat, Malaysia
- Nazmi Ismail, Malaysia
- Sabihis Md. Pandi, Malaysia
- Scott & Dhameer Abbas, Malaysia
- Shafiq Nordin, Malaysia
- Zizan Rozman, Malaysia

== Reception ==
Among the artworks that received the most attention were the artworks created by Badruddin Shah Abdul Wahab, Firdaus Mahadi and Khairul Arshad, where they were all valued at RM6 000, RM5 000 and RM5 500 respectively apiece.

== See also ==
- Siti Nurhaliza
- 2014 in Malaysia
- Steps of Legacy
