= Hari Raya songs =

Malay holiday songs

Hari Raya songs (also known as Lagu Raya in Malay) are Malays Eid ul Fitr songs.

== Popular Hari Raya albums by major discographies ==
=== EMI ===
- 16 Lagu Lagu Hari Raya Aidil Fitri (16 Eid ul Fitr songs) (P) 1982 EMI (Malaysia) Sdn Bhd
- Selamat Hari Raya Aidilfitri (Happy Eid-Ul-Fitr) (P) 1973 EMI (Singapore) Pte Ltd
- Gempaq Raya (P) 1998 EMI (Malaysia) Sdn Bhd
- Citarasa Emas Aidilfitri (P) 1992 EMI (Malaysia) Sdn Bhd
- Bergembira Di Hari Raya (P) 1977 EMI (Malaysia) Sdn Bhd
- Selamat Hari Raya Aidilfitri (2003 Version) (P) 2003 EMI (Malaysia) Sdn Bhd
- Album Hari Raya (P) 1981 EMI (Malaysia) Sdn Bhd
- Bersama Di Hari Raya (P) 1985 EMI (Malaysia) Sdn Bhd

=== Warner Music ===
- Aidilfitri Bermaaf-Maafan
- Gilang Gemilang Di Aidilfitri
- Hari Raya by Raihan

=== BMG ===
- Raya Punya

=== Domo Records ===
- The Light of The Spirit

=== Sony Music ===
- Warna Warni Aidilfitri

=== SonyBMG ===
- Satu Hari Di Hari Raya (1994)
- Kemeriahan Di Hari Raya (1996)

=== Radical Records ===
- Rasa Nikmat Syawal

== List of popular Hari Raya songs ==
=== EMI ===
- Saloma - "Selamat Hari Raya"
- P. Ramlee - "Dendang Perantau"
- Fazidah Joned - "Selamat Hari Raya"
- Ahmad Jais - "Selamat Hari Raya"
- Sanisah Huri - "Aidilfitri"
- Rafeah Buang - "Bila Takbir Bergema"
- Junainah M Amin - "Suasana Riang (Di Hari Raya)"
- Sanisah Huri - "Bersabarlah Sayang"
- Sharifah Aini - "Hari Yang Mulia"
- Sharifah Aini - "Suasana Hari Raya"
- Uji Rashid & Hail Amir - "Seloka Hari Raya"
- D J Dave - "Menjelang Hari Raya"
- Halil Chik feat. Trio Manja - "Lenggang Mak Limah"
- Sudirman - "Dari Jauh Ku Pohon Maaf"
- Aman Shah - "Kepulangan Yang Dinanti"
- Black Dog Bone - "Cahaya Aidilfitri"
- Noorkumalasari - "Pulang Di Hari Raya"
- Anuar & Ellina - "Suasana Di Hari Raya"
- Gaya Zakri - "Ucap Selamat Hari Raya"
- Sharifah Aini - "Nostalgia Aidilfitri"
- Rosemaria - "Di Pagi Aidilfitri"
- Khairil Johari Johar - "Sepasang Kurung Biru"
- Gaya Zakri, D J Dave & Rosemaria - "Senandung Hari Raya"
- Cenderawasih - "Bersama Di Hari Raya"
- Sweet September - "Hari Raya Tetap Tiba"
- Sheila Majid - "Hari Mulia"
- Rahimah Rahim - "Selamat Berhari Raya"
- P. Ramlee/D J Dave - "Suara Takbir"
- M Nasir - "Satu Hari Di Hari Raya"
- Mamat Exist - "Ku Pohon Restu"
- Dikir Temasek - "Bergema Suara Takbir"
- Dayangku Intan - "Senandung Hari Raya Untukmu"

=== Warner Music ===
- Uji Rashid & Hail Amir - "Pengertian Hari Raya"
- Jamal Abdillah - "Salam Aidilfitri"

=== BMG ===
- Awie & Ziana Zain - "Halaman Asmara"
- Awie & Ziana Zain - "Sensasi Hari Raya" (theme song for Salem raya commercial)
- Ramlah Ram - Cahaya Aidilfitri
- Nurul - Rindu Syahdu Di Hari Raya
- Ziana Zain - Indah Di Hari Raya
- Mamat Exist- Ku Pohon Restu Ayah Bonda

=== Domo Records ===
- Kitarō - "The Field"

=== Sony Music ===
- Aishah - "Pulanglah"
- Amy Mastura - "Setahun Sekali"
- Warna Warni Aidilfitri - "Nyanyian Ramai"

=== Radical Records ===
- Acam asad - "Rasa Nikmat Syawal"
