= Menatap dalam Mimpi =

Single by Siti Nurhaliza

from the album Unplugged
- Released: 30 June 2015
- Recorded: June 2015; Cranky Music; (Petaling Jaya, Selangor)
- Genre: Pop
- Length: 4:58
- Label: Siti Nurhaliza Productions; Universal Music Group (Malaysia)
- Songwriters: Aubrey Suwito; Rozi Sang Dewi

Siti Nurhaliza singles chronology
"Mikraj Cinta" (2015)	"Menatap dalam Mimpi" (2015)	"Hari Kemenangan" (2016)

"Menatap dalam Mimpi" (Staring in a Dream) is a single by Malaysian artist, Siti Nurhaliza. It is the second bonus track from her live album, Unplugged to serve as a single after "Mikraj Cinta" in 2015. Music for the song is written by Aubrey Suwito while its lyrics are provided by Rozi Sang Dewi. A tribute to her late father, Tarudin Ismail, thematically the lyrics for "Menatap dalam Mimpi" revolves around her longing feelings for him. On 2 November 2016, its final official music video was uploaded to Siti Nurhaliza's official Vevo account after its first music video was retracted in less than 12 hours it was published in August.

In September 2015, "Menatap dalam Mimpi" was nominated for 2015 Anugerah Planet Muzik for Best Female Singer. A year later, on 18 December 2016, the song won two nominations from 2016 Anugerah Industri Muzik for Best Musical Arrangement in a Song and Best Vocal Performance in a Song (Female). "Menatap dalam Mimpi" earned her 13th Best Vocal Performance in a Song (Female) from Anugerah Industri Muzik in total. The song was also nominated for Best Pop Song.

== Background and recording ==
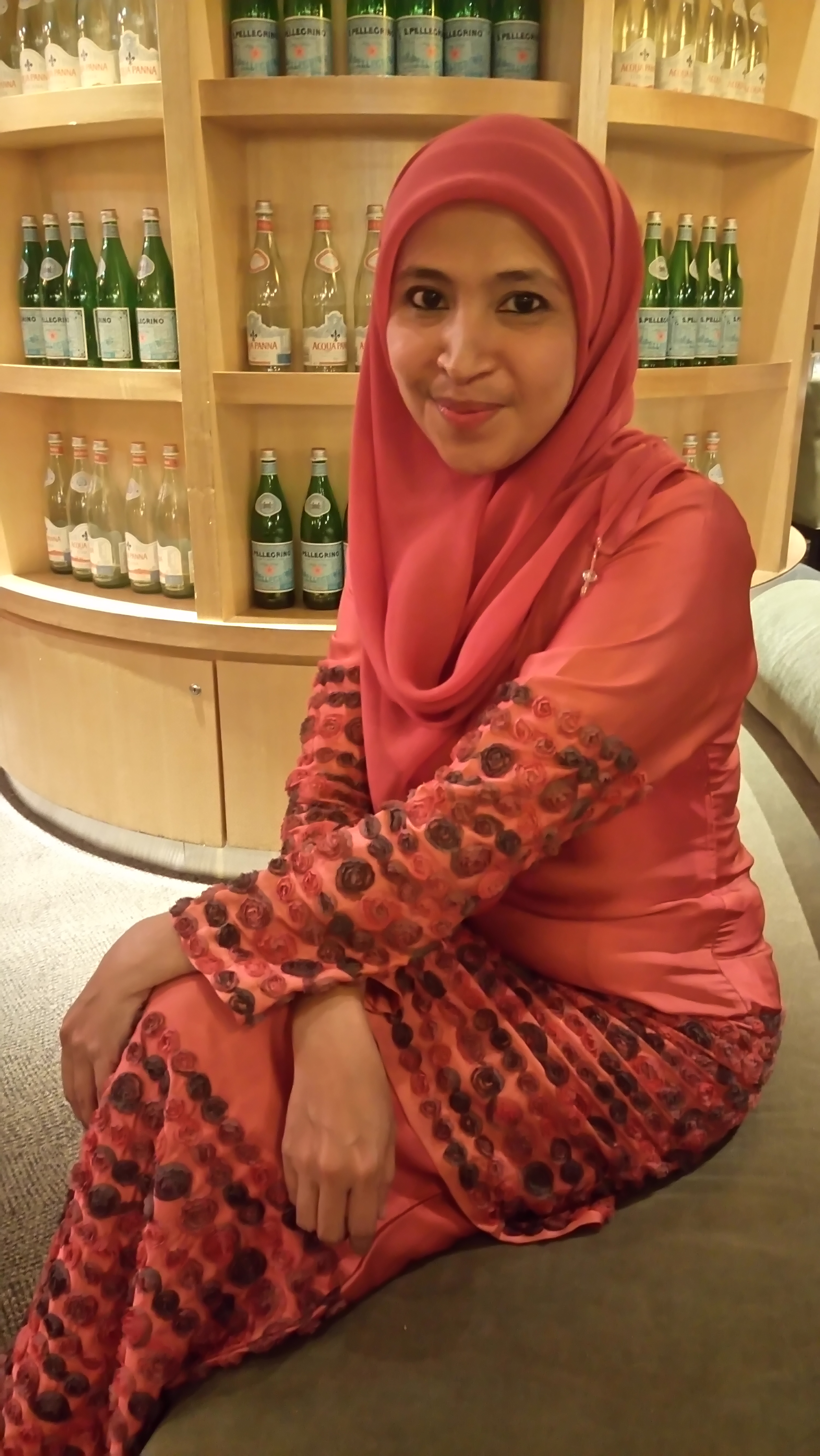
Rozi Abdul Razak (Rozi Sang Dewi) wrote the lyrics for "Menatap dalam Mimpi".

The production of "Menatap dalam Mimpi" began when Siti Nurhaliza decided to include three additional tracks to accompany the release of her 2015 live album, Unplugged—"Engkau", "Menatap dalam Mimpi", and "Mikraj Cinta". According to the composer Aubrey Suwito, the inspiration for him to write the melody to "Menatap dalam Mimpi" came when he read a poem that was written and uploaded by Siti's sister-in-law and personal manager Rozi Abdul Razak on her personal Twitter account. Upon reading the poem, it only took Aubrey 20 minutes to compose the melody. Rozi who is also Siti's personal manager and sister-in-law was tasked by Siti to compose lyrics that best describe about "losing someone that we truly love". (Note: Original:"[...] kehilangan seseorang yang sangat kita sayang.")

The recording session for "Menatap dalam Mimpi" took place in June 2015. Recorded at Aubrey's personal recording studio, Siti is said to love the melody of the song at its first preview. She admitted that the song's composition is really challenging. She also said, "It possesses the musical elements that require me to diversify the usage of my vocal range. It would not be wrong for me to say, that it is like a musical song that we often heard in films by Walt Disney. (Note: Original:"Ia memiliki elemen muzikal yang memerlukan saya mempelbagaikan penggunaan julat vokal (vokal range) saya. Tidak salah kalau saya katakan, ia seperti sebuah lagu muzikal yang sering kita dengar dalam filem-filem Walt Disney.") According to Siti, her take on this song is that it is describing her feelings when she lost her late father. She described, "The recording process was so challenging because I was swept by emotions. Aubrey gave me a lot of input and I'm proud of how it had turned out."

== Composition and lyrics ==
A pop ballad, the song lasts for four minutes and fifty eight seconds. The song is fully composed and produced by Aubrey Suwito. It only took him 20 minutes to compose the melody of the song after reading a poem that was written by Rozi Abdul Razak, Siti's personal manager. Rozi was later tasked to write the lyrics that tell a story about someone losing someone that we really love. According to Siti, the song requires her to play around with her vocal range.

== Release and promotion ==
The song was included when Unplugged was commercially released for download and stream on various platforms including iTunes, Spotify, and Deezer on 30 June 2015. An acoustic rendition of "Menatap dalam Mimpi" was also included exclusively for iTunes release. On 2 April 2016, "Menatap dalam Mimpi" was performed live for the first time during the Dato' Siti Nurhaliza & Friends Concert at Stadium Negara.

On 15 August 2016, its first music video was released although her recording company decided to retract the music video after it was published for only 12 hours. On 2 November 2016, the final music video for the song was finally uploaded with a totally different concept, storyline, and made by a different production house.

== Music videos ==
In the first frame, it shows Siti walking in a garden in her dream. In the lower frame, it shows Siti who is holding a flower similar to that in her dream.

"Menatap dalam Mimpi"'s first music video was published on YouTube in August. The music video was later retracted in less than 12 hours after it was published. In an interview with Kosmo!, Siti commented on the retraction as, "I understand that everyone in the music video production has done their best, but the result is not good enough for me. Not only that, I want to reshoot the music video because I feel it can be improved. Alhamdulillah, when the matter was brought up to Universal Music Malaysia, they agreed to reshoot the music video." (Note: Original:"Saya faham semua pihak produksi klip video tersebut telah melakukan yang terbaik tetapi hasilnya kurang memuaskan bagi diri saya. Bukan itu sahaja, saya ingin membikin semula video tersebut kerana saya merasakan ia boleh diperbaiki. Alhamdulillah, apabila hal tersebut disuarakan kepada pihak Universal Music Malaysia, mereka bersetuju untuk membikin semula klip video berkenaan.")

After the first music video was retracted, Universal Music Malaysia agreed to reshoot the music video by using different production and storyline. For the remake, they hired Nadiah Hamzah to direct the new music video. Shot at Lake Gardens, Kuala Lumpur and Taman Melati, the final music video was released on 2 November 2016. Its behind-the-scene video was also released on the same day. Commenting on the new production, Siti said, "This time around, I'm leaving it to the song producers themselves. I just want a different interpretation for that song so that it will be more subtle and not too obvious." (Note: Original:"Kali ini saya serahkan kepada pihak penerbit lagu tersebut. Saya cuma mahukan terjemahan berbeza terhadap lagu tersebut supaya ia lebih lembut dan tidak terlalu terang-terangan.")

=== Synopsis ===
The music video begins with Siti, wearing a light pink hijab and dress, walking in towards the kitchen. In the following scene, she poured herself a cup of tea and then walked to the couch and started writing on a notebook and typing on a MacBook. She started to sing in the living room. After a while, she fell asleep and started dreaming. The dream begins with a scene in a flower garden. As day turned to night, she finally woke up. She later was shown sitting in front of a dressing mirror.

Cut to the next scene, when she opened a small wooden box, the content of the box is revealed – a written note and several photos from her past, including photos of her, her husband, and her late father. The video cuts back to the dream in the flower garden. As she enjoys the scenery, various scenes showing her sitting on the bed and walking in the garden are shown. As she falls asleep in her dream, the camera focuses on the pink flower petals that were scattering next to her. The music video ends with a scene showing Siti holding a piece of pink flower in the palms of her hands.

== Format and track listing ==
- Unplugged
1. "Menatap dalam Mimpi" – 4:58
- Unplugged (iTunes Bonus Track)
1. "Menatap dalam Mimpi" (Acoustic) – 4:37

== Credits and personnel ==
Song

- Dato' Siti Nurhaliza – vocals
- Aji – guitar
- Aksana Yupusova – violin
- Alla Yanisheva – violin
- Aubrey Suwito – composer, production, arrangement, music programming
- Brian Larson – violin
- Florian Antier – cello
- Jae Sern Lim – violin
- Jay Franco (Sterling Sound) – mastering
- Nasran Nawi – cello
- Rozi Sang Dewi – lyricist
- Sunil Kumar – mixing
- Toko Inomoto – viola
- Veronika Thoene – viola
- Yap Yen – violin

Credits adapted from Unplugged booklet liner notes.

Music video

- Ali – art
- Awan Kiko – camera
- Cinerent Malaysia – equipment rental
- Darren Siew – stylist
- Dien Ismethz – cinematographer
- Eddie Yap – art
- Epie Temerloh – makeup artist
- Eyta – stylist assistant
- Hafiz – lighting and grip
- Hasri – lighting and grip
- Hour Tan – landscaper
- Ihsan – lighting and grip
- Izza Abadiey – caterer
- Jack Lee Tze Loong – production design
- Jazz Ton – art
- Jeff Mah – camera
- Leena – makeup artist assistant
- Man Jepun – gaffer
- Muhammad Bahir – producer, editor
- Nadiah Hamzah – director
- Prinz Jones N. Joseph – first assistant director
- Razlan Ramli – key grip
- Shah – location manager
- Suresh – facilities
- Tham Kar Kit – art
- Wafi – location manager
- Yong @ APV – colourist
- Yunus Nuar Omar – production manager

Credits adapted from "Menatap dalam Mimpi" music video credits.

== Awards ==
In September 2015, "Menatap dalam Mimpi" was nominated for 2015 Anugerah Planet Muzik for Best Female Singer. A year later, on 18 December 2016, the song won two nominations from 2016 Anugerah Industri Muzik for Best Musical Arrangement in a Song and Best Vocal Performance in a Song (Female). "Menatap dalam Mimpi" earned her 13th Best Vocal Performance in a Song (Female) from Anugerah Industri Muzik in total. The song was also nominated for Best Pop Song.

=== Anugerah Planet Muzik ===
Year	Nominated work	Category	Result
2015	"Menatap dalam Mimpi"	Best Female Singer	Nominated

=== Anugerah Industri Muzik ===
Year	Nominated work	Category	Result
2016	"Menatap dalam Mimpi"	Best Vocal Performance in a Song (Female)	Won
2016	"Menatap dalam Mimpi"	Best Musical Arrangement in a Song	Won
2016	"Menatap dalam Mimpi"	Best Pop Song	Nominated
