= Anta Permana =

Single by Siti Nurhaliza

from the album ManifestaSITI2020
- Released: 21 September 2018 (digital)
- Recorded: 17 August 2018
- Studio: Qactus Studio, Petaling Jaya
- Genre: Pop
- Length: 3:24
- Label: Siti Nurhaliza Productions; Universal Music Malaysia
- Songwriters: Ezra Kong; Hael Husaini
- Producers: Ezra Kong; Hael Husaini

Siti Nurhaliza singles chronology
"Comel Pipi Merah" (2018)	"Anta Permana" (2018)	"Kasihku Selamanya" (2019)

Music video
- "Anta Permana" on YouTube

"Anta Permana" (transl. "Infinity") is a song by Malaysian singer Siti Nurhaliza, released on 21 September 2018 as the first single from Siti Nurhaliza's nineteenth studio album, ManifestaSITI2020 (2020). The song was composed by Ezra Kong and Hael Husaini, its title was derived from a classical Malay word which means infinity.

A music video was filmed and released on 4 October 2018, to promote the single, which was directed by Rifaiee Omar. "Anta Permana" is the second single to be released by Siti Nurhaliza in 2018, the first of two being "Comel Pipi Merah" ("Adorable Rosy Cheeks") which was released in March to coincide with birth of Siti's newborn child, Siti Aafiyah Khalid. As of May 2019, it bagged 11 platinum certifications with more than 14 million views in YouTube.

== Music video ==
The music video for "Anta Permana" was released on Siti Nurhaliza's official YouTube channel on 4 October 2018. Directed by Rifaiee Omar and produced by Rio Films Sdn. Bhd. Since its release, it garnered less than 323 thousand views.

== Commercial performance ==
"Anta Permana" successfully reached the iTunes chart, surpassing "Head Above Water" by Canadian singer, Avril Lavigne. The song's hashtag also became trending in social media.

== Format and track listing ==
- Digital download
1. "Anta Permana" – 3:24

== Release history ==
Country	Date	Format	Label
Malaysia	21 September 2018	Digital download; streaming	Siti Nurhaliza Productions; Universal Music Malaysia

== Charts ==
Chart (2018)	Peak position
Top 30 Singles Chart Malaysia	11
RIM Charts (Domestic)	4
Carta 40 Era Fm	1
Carta 40 Hotfm	1
Carta 40 Suriafm	1

== Awards and nominations ==
Year	Award	Category	Result
2019	Anugerah MeleTOP Era 2019	Lagu MeleTOP	Nominated
2019	Anugerah Juara Lagu ke-34	AJL-34	2nd Runner-up
