= SimetriSiti =

Studio album by Siti Nurhaliza
- Released: 10 May 2017
- Recorded: March – April 2017
- Studio: Various: Cranky Music Studio, Ben at Ark Studio, babyBoss Studio, Harem Studio, and Supra Seven Studio (Malaysia); iSound Studio (Indonesia)
- Genres: Pop; R&B
- Length: 40:04
- Labels: SNP; Universal Music Malaysia; EMI
- Producers: Ade Govinda; Aubrey Suwito; Jeje Govinda; Jenny Chin; Firdaus Mahmud; Mujahid Abdul Wahab; Opick; Sze Wan

Siti Nurhaliza chronology
Unplugged (2015)	SimetriSiti (2017)	ManifestaSITI2020 (2020)

Alternative cover
- Lazada Malaysia Exclusive Cover (Note: The exclusive cover is only available through pre-order on Lazada Malaysia. Due to its exclusive cover, complete with printed Siti's signature, all 300 copies that were made available ran out of stock in 20 minutes.)

Singles from SimetriSiti
- 1. "Segala Perasaan" Released: 28 April 2017; 2. "Bersandar Cinta" Released: 15 June 2017; 3. "Aku Bukan Malaikat" Released: 21 September 2017; 4. "Kau Takdirku" Released: 12 February 2018

SimetriSiti is the eighteenth studio album and seventeenth Malay-language album by Malaysian singer, Siti Nurhaliza. It was released by Universal Music Malaysia and her own Siti Nurhaliza Productions on 10 May 2017. Recorded in March and April 2017, the album was a collaboration between Malaysian and Indonesian composers, lyricists, and producers.

Pre-order for an exclusive edition of SimetriSiti was made available on Lazada Malaysia on 5 May 2017, and all 300 available copies sold out in 20 minutes. "Segala Perasaan" (All of My Feelings), the debut single for the album, was released on 28 April 2017.

== Background ==
"Alhamdulillah, the responses were great. From 300 songs that were submitted, I only choose the best 10 songs that fit with the concept of the album. Even until today (March 2017), there are still musicians who sent their songs and I really appreciate their effort."

— Siti Nurhaliza on recording SimetriSiti (Note: Original:"Alhamdulillah, sambutan memang menggalakkan. Daripada 300 lagu yang dihantar, Siti hanya memilih 10 yang terbaik dan bersesuaian dengan konsep album. Sehingga kini pun masih ada lagi pihak yang menghantar lagu ciptaan mereka dan Siti sangat menghargai usaha mereka.")

In November 2016, she revealed that prior to her 3-week holiday trip, she requested Aubrey Suwito to make an announcement on his Facebook page in search of new songs for her latest album. She also requested a number of Malaysian and Indonesian artists to provide songs to her, including Hazami and Opick. Until November 2016, she has received more than 300 song submissions, including from Indonesian songwriters. She commented on her song choices as, "I am not too picky [whether they are] new or old composers, what is more important is that their songs have to be easy to be accepted and catchy. But, I still prioritize good and mature song arrangement quality." (Note: Original:"Saya tidak terlalu memilih komposer baharu atau lama, apa yang penting ialah lagu tersebut mesti mudah diterima dan catchy. Namun, saya masih mementingkan kualiti gubahan muzik yang matang dan bagus.")

The whole process, from vetting and finalizing the song candidates to recording the entire album took her and her team five months to finish. For the first four months, she had to attend few listening sessions several times before choosing the best 10 songs. The best 10 songs were chosen based on votes by her, her management, and her recording company. To prevent bias during the song selection, it was done without prior knowledge of the composers' identity.

The total album production cost for SimetriSiti is cited to be roughly RM 100 000.

== Recording and production ==
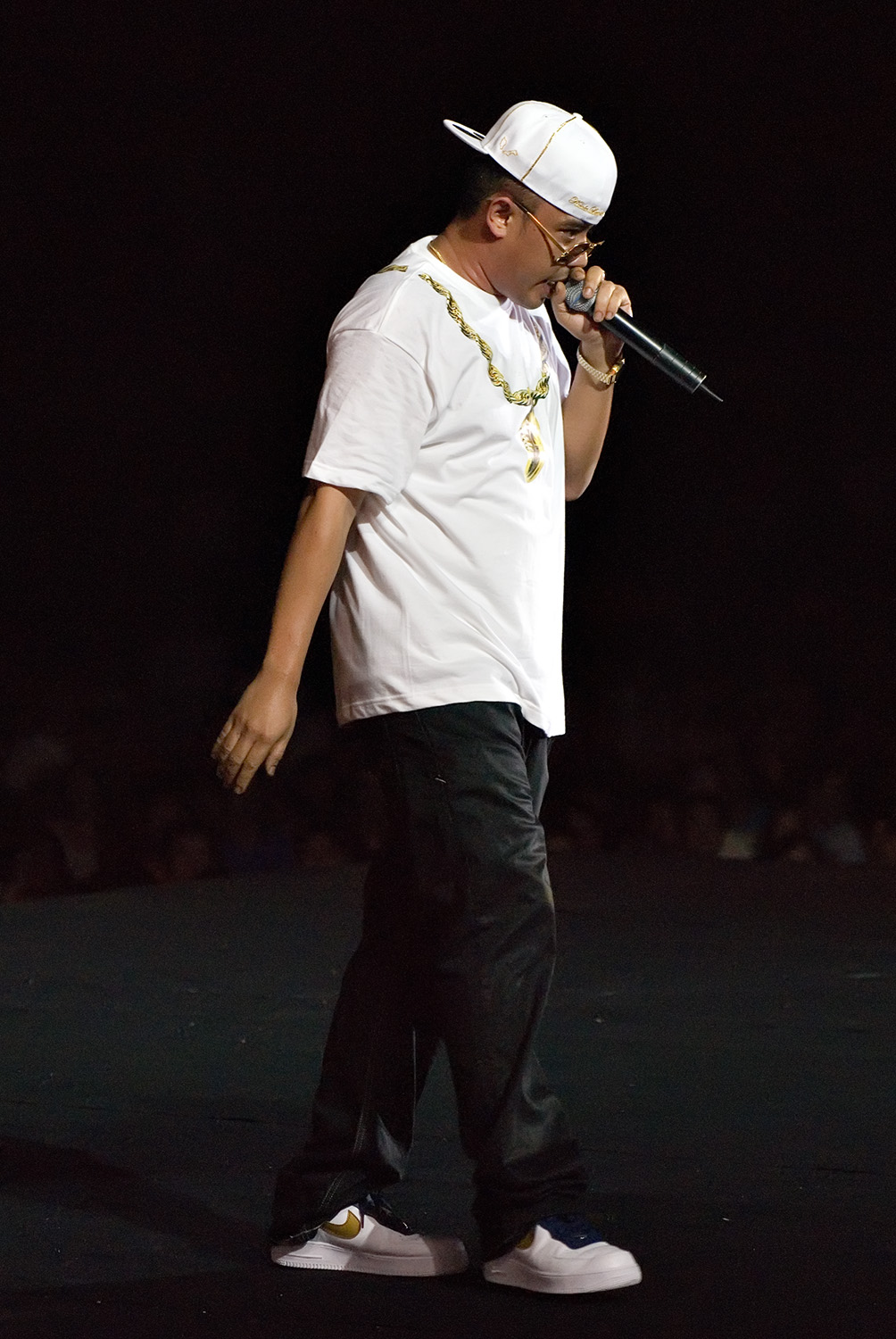
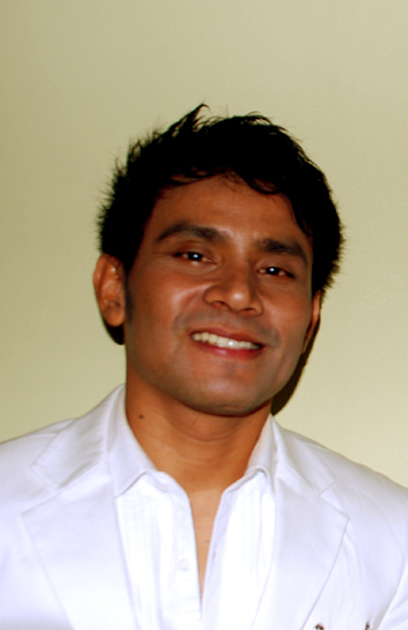
Joe Flizzow (left) and Judika (right) served as a featuring artist and duet partner respectively for SimetriSiti.

Although originally scheduled for March 2017 release, the recording process for the album only began early March 2017. At early stages of the recording, she admitted that she had difficulty in singing some of the songs due to poor health. However, with proper training from her vocal teacher, she was able to complete the recordings in the stipulated time. She commented, "Initially, I felt as if I was not ready to record my first and second songs, but, thankfully, when listening to the pieces again, I found that the songs presented a different side of my vocals."

During the early stages of the album planning in January 2017, she revealed that one song from the album will be recorded in Mandarin. However the idea was scrapped leaving her with one track less. A last minute idea, she decided to pen and compose a song specially dedicated to her fans, "Penghiburku" (My Entertainers). Before composing the song, she had a rough time in composing a complete tune. The inspiration for the music came to her when she was visiting her step daughter-in-law, Tya Arifin who was in labor in March 2017. She recalled the moment, "[I] didn't expect for "Penghiburku"'s melody to strike [my] mind when I was accompanying [my] step daughter-in-law. I immediately recorded the melody with my phone and sent it to Aubrey to be produced." (Note: Original:"Tidak sangka pula pada melodi lagu Penghiburku muncul dalam kotak minda ketika menemani menantu tiri. Saya segera rakamkan melodi tersebut menggunakan telefon bimbit lalu dihantar kepada Aubrey untuk diterbitkan.") When she submitted the demo to Sze Wan, she suggested to Siti that some rapping to be included in the upbeat song which led to the involvement of Joe Flizzow to provide the additional verses. The lyrics for "Penghiburku" on the other hand, were composed by Siti on the day of recording itself.

Apart from employing local Malaysian talents, Siti also sourced musicians and artists from Indonesia to contribute to the materials in SimetriSiti. Ivan Lahardika, an Indonesian musician, produced two songs for the album, including "Segala Perasaan" (All of My Feelings), the album's first single. He is also responsible for the duet "Kisah Ku Inginkan" (The Story that I Want) with another Indonesian singer, Judika. The idea for the collaboration began when both Siti and Judika performed together at 2014 Anugerah Planet Muzik. Although she originally planned to fly to Indonesia to record "Kisah Ku Inginkan" in March 2017, she later recorded the song in Malaysia with Yasin Sulaiman as her vocal producer. To record the vocals for "Tak Perlu Ragu" (No Need to Doubt) however, she did travel to Indonesia. Produced by Ade Govinda and Jeje Govinda, she recorded the song on 16 March 2017.

The last song to be recorded for SimetriSiti was "Aku Bukan Malaikat" (I'm Not an Angel) which was recorded on 6 April 2017. "Aku Bukan Malaikat" is composed and produced by Opick. She requested for a new song from the Indonesian singer/composer when they were both involved in "Konsert Rapatkan Saf" back in October 2016. She described "Aku Bukan Malaikat" as a song specially for "sentimental women" like herself. She admitted that she was swept by her emotions when she was recording the song and she had to quickly gather herself and control her emotions. "Aku Bukan Malaikat" is revealed to be the most expensive song in the album.

Five songs from SimetriSiti, "Bersandar Cinta" (Out of Love), "Ikrar Cinta" (Love Vow), "Manis Terindah" (Sweet, Loveliest), "Segala Perasaan", and "Tak Perlu Ragu" received strings orchestra composition from Bulgarian National Radio Symphony Orchestra. The strings orchestra recording for the five songs were done in Bulgaria and it took them hours to complete. The recordings were later sent back to Malaysia for the mixing process. The audio mastering for all tracks were done by Jay Franco of Sterling Sound in New York City.

== Artwork and title ==
"The album also reflects me, as a well-balanced person and the kind of music which has been associated with me from the day I started my singing career. From mastering to the making of the album cover, everything has been given equal love and care."

— Siti Nurhaliza on the concept of SimetriSiti

Unlike Fragmen, her previous studio album where she said it is more personal, the title SimetriSiti was chosen by Siti because it represents the equal (symmetrical, in a sense) treatment given to each song in the album, from choosing the composers and songs, the way the lyrics were sung and up to the recording production in general.

The design and cover for the album were said to be inspired by "Marilyn Monroe-esque 1950's fashion sense". The standard cover of the album features her and a group of her fans acting as paparazzi. According to Siti, the Hollywood retro album cover was chosen because it represents her 21 years of journey as an entertainer. She genuinely feels that her career has been supported by her fans, photographers, make-up artists, fashion designers, and journalists, and, "It is appropriate for me to visually portray them through SimetriSiti's album cover design." (Note: Original:"[...] molek rasanya jika saya abadikan mereka secara visual menerusi rekaan kulit album SimetriSiti.") The exclusive version of album, available only for pre-order on Lazada Malaysia, features a different cover, complete with printed signature of hers. Due to its exclusivity, the pre-order for the album that was supposed to last for four days (5 until 9 May), ended in only 20 minutes.

== Release and promotion ==
To promote the release of SimetriSiti, pre-order for exclusive version of the album was made available on Lazada Malaysia from 5 until 9 May 2017. However, all 300 copies of the album sold out within 20 minutes. Unlike its standard cover release, the exclusive version features an entirely different front cover, complete with printed signature of Siti's. On 5 May too, she launched the album at The Royale Chulan Hotel, Kuala Lumpur. During the album launch, she sang a medley of all 10 songs from SimetriSiti in 20 minutes. Music videos for "Segala Perasaan" and "Bersandar Cinta" were also previewed during the event.

For the Indonesian market however, SimetriSiti only has nine tracks. Since the copyright for the song is shared between Universal Music Group (Malaysia) and Sony Music Indonesia, "Kisah Ku Inginkan", the duet with Judika will not be available in SimetriSiti in Indonesia. Instead, the track will be included in Judika's upcoming album.

The album is also available at the Creacion boutique and selected Petronas stations.

=== Singles ===
"Segala Perasaan" was released as SimetriSiti's first single. It was released on 27 April for streaming and download. Upon its release, "Segala Perasaan" charted atop of iTunes Malaysia. According to Siti, "Segala Perasaan" challenges her vocals and requires her to really understand the lyrics while singing. As for the single's music video, Siti plays a superheroine, her first role as such.

== Track listing ==
No.	Title	Writer(s)	Producer(s)	Length
1.	"Bersandar Cinta"	Aubrey Suwito; Ad Samad	Aubrey Suwito	3:58
2.	"Penghiburku" (featuring Joe Flizzow)	Siti Nurhaliza	Sze Wan	3:28
3.	"Ikrar Cinta"	Amirah Ali; Sulu Sarawak	Jenny Chin	3:48
4.	"Segala Perasaan"	Ivan Lahardika	Mujahid Abd Wahab	4:43
5.	"Aku Bukan Malaikat"	Opick; Dian	Opick	4:07
6.	"Manis Terindah"	Aubrey Suwito; Ad Samad	Aubrey Suwito	3:48
7.	"Kisah Ku Inginkan" (with Judika)	Ivan Lahardika	Mujahid Abd Wahab	4:28
8.	"Tak Perlu Ragu"	Ade Govinda	Ade Govinda; Jeje Govinda	3:35
9.	"Kau Takdirku"	Mohariz Yaakup; Habsah Hassan	Firdaus Mahmud	3:59
10.	"Hiasi Duniaku"	Sid Murshid	Sze Wan	4:10
Total length:				40:04

Indonesian Version
No.	Title	Writer(s)	Producer(s)	Length
1.	"Bersandar Cinta"	Aubrey Suwito; Ad Samad	Aubrey Suwito	3:58
2.	"Penghiburku" (featuring Joe Flizzow)	Siti Nurhaliza	Sze Wan	3:28
3.	"Ikrar Cinta"	Amirah Ali; Sulu Sarawak	Jenny Chin	3:48
4.	"Segala Perasaan"	Ivan Lahardika	Mujahid Abd Wahab	4:43
5.	"Aku Bukan Malaikat"	Opick; Dian	Opick	4:07
6.	"Manis Terindah"	Aubrey Suwito; Ad Samad	Aubrey Suwito	3:48
7.	"Tak Perlu Ragu"	Ade Govinda	Ade Govinda; Jeje Govinda	3:35
8.	"Kau Takdirku"	Mohariz Yaakup; Habsah Hassan	Firdaus Mahmud	3:59
9.	"Hiasi Duniaku"	Sid Murshid	Sze Wan	4:10
Total length:				35:36

== Personnel ==
Credits adapted from SimetriSiti booklet liner notes.

Performers and musicians

- Aji – guitar (track 1, 6)
- Arthur Kam – drums (track 10)
- Aznan Alias – guitar (track 9)
- Azran Hamzah (Awe) – background vocals (track 9)
- Eja Muhammad Nor (Eja) – background vocals (track 9)
- Joe Flizzow – vocals (track 2)
- Helmy Metz – background vocals (track 7)
- Hendra J Pristiwa – strings (track 7)
- Ivan Lahardika – guitar (track 4, 7), keyboard (track 4, 7)
- Jantan Prama Putra – drums (track 7)
- John Thomas – drums (track 3)
- Judika – vocals (track 7)
- Juwita Suwito – background vocals (track 2)
- Levi Lebon – bass (track 4, 7)
- Norman Abd Rahman – bass (track 3)
- Sani Harjasyah Rusmadi – drums (track 4)
- Shamril Salleh – guitar (track 2, 10)
- Sham Kamikaze – acoustic guitar (track 3), electric guitar (track 3)
- Siti Nurhaliza – vocals (track 1–10)
- Yucky Yulianti – background vocals (track 4, 7)

Technical

- Ad Samad – lyricist (track 1, 6)
- Ade Govinda – record producer (track 8), arrangement (track 8), composer (track 8), lyricist (track 8)
- Aiman – promotional unit (Siti Nurhaliza Productions)
- Aisyah Wong Mei Chen – artists and repertoire, new business development unit (Universal Music Group)
- Alud – promotional unit (Siti Nurhaliza Productions)
- Amirah Ali – composer (track 3)
- Anuar Sujud – creation, design
- Aubrey Suwito – album project manager (track 1–10), record producer (track 1, 6), composer (track 1, 6) recording (track 1, 6), arrangement (track 1, 6), production (track 4), keyboard (track 1, 6), programming (track 1, 6)
- Ari Renaldi – mixing (track 5, 8)
- Bah Shu Hann – new business development unit (Universal Music Group)
- Bryan Wong – promotional unit (Universal Music Group)
- Carrie Ng – new business development unit (Universal Music Group)
- Dani P.O – drums (track 5)
- Dian – lyricist (track 5)
- Dimawan Krisnowo Adji – arrangement (track 4)
- Emily Fong – promotional unit (Universal Music Group)
- Epie Temerloh Miracle Touch – make-up
- Fadhil Kamarudin – photography
- Fadzli Fauzy – recording (track 9), mixing (track 9)
- Farah Rafie – photography
- Felix Voon – mixing (track 2, 10)
- Firdaus Mahmud – record producer (track 9), arrangement (track 9), keyboard (track 9), programming (track 9)
- Habsah Hassan – lyricist (track 9)
- Ivan Lahardika – composer (track 4, 7), lyricist (track 4, 7), arrangement (track 4, 7)
- Jac Ng – commercial unit (Universal Music Group)
- Jay Franco (Sterling Sound) – mastering (track 1–10)
- Jeje Govinda – record producer (track 8), arrangement (track 8)
- Jenny Chin – record producer (track 3), recording (track 3), arrangement (track 3), keyboard (track 3), programming (track 3)
- Joe Flizzow – lyricist (track 2)
- Jovian Mandagie – wardrobe
- Judika – production (track 7)
- Keith Yong – recording (track 1, 3, 6)
- Kim Lim – new business development unit (Universal Music Group)
- Kylie Koh – commercial unit (Universal Music Group)
- Leonard Fong – scoring session co-ordinator (track 1, 3, 4, 6, 8), recording supervisor (track 1, 3, 4, 6, 8)
- Martin – keyboard (track 5), programming (track 5), guitar (track 5), bass (track 5)
- Minni Gan – promotional unit (Universal Music Group)
- Miselyn Lem – new business development unit (Universal Music Group)
- Mohariz Yaakup – composer (track 9)
- Mujahid Abd Wahab – record producer (track 4, 7)
- Nicholas Han – promotional unit (Universal Music Group)
- Opick – record producer (track 5), composer (track 5), arrangement (track 5)
- Paul Morrison – mixing (track 6)
- Peter Chong – mixing (track 3, 10)
- Phoebe Heng – promotional unit (Universal Music Group)
- Rachel Sandra Danker – digital production unit (Universal Music Group)
- Rizman Ruzaini – wardrobe
- Rozi Abdul Razak – artists and repertoire, promotional unit (Siti Nurhaliza Productions)
- Saida – promotional unit (Siti Nurhaliza Productions)
- Sham Kamikaze – recording (track 3)
- Shirley Tan – studio manager (track 1, 4, 6, 8)
- Sid Murshid – composer (track 10), lyricist (track 10)
- Siti Fairuz Ibrahim – promotional unit (Siti Nurhaliza Productions)
- Siti Nurhaliza – composer (track 2), lyricist (track 2)
- Steven Chen – digital production unit (Universal Music Group)
- Sulu Sarawak – lyricist (track 3)
- Sunil Kumar – mixing (track 1)
- Sze Wan – record producer (track 2, 10), arrangement (track 2, 10)
- Tee Tze Mien – promotional unit (Universal Music Group)
- Tiffany Haruka Teh – promotional unit (Universal Music Group)
- Wawan Qreebow – mixing (track 4, 7)
- Yasin Sulaiman – production (track 5, 7)
- Yin Siow Paung – commercial unit (Universal Music Group)

Bulgarian technical personnel

- Christo Pavlov – conductor (track 1, 3, 4, 6, 8)
- Gabriele Conti – Pro Tools recordist (track 1, 3, 4, 6, 8)
- Marco Streccioni – scoring engineer (track 1, 3, 4, 6, 8)
- Slav Slavtchev – orchestra manager (track 1, 3, 4, 6, 8)

== Certification ==
Country	Certification	Sales/Shipments
Malaysia^{Exclusive Version}	Sold out	300

== Release history ==
Region	Release date	Format	Label
Malaysia	10 May 2017	CD, digital download	Universal Music Group (Malaysia)
Singapore	10 May 2017	CD, digital download	Universal Music Group (Malaysia)
Brunei	10 May 2017	CD, digital download	Universal Music Group (Malaysia)
Worldwide	10 May 2017	digital download	Universal Music Group (Malaysia)
Indonesia	10 May 2017	digital download	Universal Music Group (Indonesia)
Indonesia	10 May 2017	digital download	Universal Music Group (Indonesia)
Indonesia	26 May 2017	CD	Universal Music Group (Indonesia)
Japan	20 June 2017	CD	Universal Music Group
