= Comel Pipi Merah =

2018 single by Siti Nurhaliza

Single by Siti Nurhaliza

from the album Legasi
- Language: Malay
- Released: 6 March 2018 (digital)
- Recorded: 17 January 2018
- Genre: Pop
- Length: 4:43
- Label: Siti Nurhaliza Productions; Universal Music Malaysia
- Songwriters: Rozi Sang Dewi; Siti Nurhaliza
- Producer: Lee Sze Wan

Siti Nurhaliza singles chronology
"Segala Perasaan" (2017)	"Comel Pipi Merah" (2018)	"Anta Permana" (2018)

"Comel Pipi Merah" (transl. "Adorable Rosy Cheeks") is a song by Malaysian singer Siti Nurhaliza which was released on 6 March 2018. It was released as a song dedicated specifically to her firstborn who was expected to be born in March 2018 and was inspired by her father, the late Tarudin Ismail who wanted to see her have a child.

== Background and recording ==
"Comel Pipi Merah" was recorded by Dato' Sri Siti Nurhaliza on 17 January 2018 when she was 7 months pregnant. It was specially created by Siti for her firstborn who was born two months later. Her two nieces, Chitah and Damia contributed their voices by being the backing singers of this song.

== Composition and lyrics ==
"Comel Pipi Merah" was composed and produced by Siti Nurhaliza and Lee Sze Wan, and the lyrics were written by her sister-in-law, Rozi Abd Razak. It was a song specially created for Siti's firstborn, Siti Aafiyah Khalid who was born on 17 March 2018, 11 days after the song was released. The song takes the chorus of the song "Can Mali Can", a children's song.

== Release and promotion ==
"Comel Pipi Merah" was first performed at Dato' Sri Siti's gathering with Sitizoners on 21 January 2018 and was officially released on 6 March 2018 and was commercially released for download and streaming on various platforms including iTunes, Spotify, and Deezer. Less than 24 hours after its music video was uploaded, it had reached almost 100,000 views and within 10 days the song's lyric video reached more than 2 million views and the official video teaser reached an average of 1 million views per day.

== Music video ==
The official music video for this song was uploaded on Siti Nurhaliza's official Vevo account on 28 March 2018. It shows Siti preparing for the hospital, the atmosphere in the ward and during the birth process, and the face of her daughter, Siti Aafiyah.

A day after being uploaded to YouTube, it reached almost 140,000 views.

== Release history ==
Region	Date	Format	Label
Malaysia	6 March 2018	Digital download	Siti Nurhaliza Productions, Universal Music Group (Malaysia)

== Credits ==
- Siti Nurhaliza - vocals, composer
- Rozi Abd Razak - lyrics
- Lee Sze Wan - composer/publisher
- Sham Kamikaze - guitar
- John Thomas - drums
- Nomad Studio - recording studio
- Ben Tio - recording engineer
- Sunil Kumar - mixing/mastering
