= All Your Love (album) =

Studio album by Siti Nurhaliza
- Released: 16 September 2011 (Digital); 26 September 2011 (Physical)
- Recorded: January – September 2011
- Genres: Pop, dance-pop, R&B
- Length: 42:57
- Label: What's Up Entertainment
- Producers: Bryan Bouro, Christian Alexanda, Tom Diesel

Siti Nurhaliza chronology
CTKD (2009)	All Your Love (2011)	Fragmen (2014)

Singles from All Your Love
- 1. "Falling In Love" Released: 9 July 2011; 2. "Remember You" Released: 1 March 2012

All Your Love is a sixteenth studio album and a debut English-language album by Malaysian singer, Siti Nurhaliza. It was released digitally on 16 September 2011 and physically on 26 September 2011 by What's Up Entertainment, which is owned and managed by her stepson Adib Khalid. All of the tracks were produced and written by two Australian composers and producers, Bryan Bouro and Christian Alexanda.

On "Remember You" and "I'll Wait Forever", she collaborated with Sean Kingston and Christian Alexanda respectively. The production took place in late January 2011 with the voice recording of all 10 tracks taking two weeks in Kuala Lumpur, while the mixing and mastering process took place in several studios in Australia and Los Angeles.

The first single, "Falling in Love", was released and promoted on 9 July, when she performed it for the first time at one of her promotional concerts for her beauty products and cosmetic range, SimplySiti in UiTM. It was performed live again a week later at the 10th Anugerah Planet Muzik. The album as of March 2012, has sold a total of more than 70 000 units from both digital and physical releases.

== Background and recording ==
I want an English album as a memento of my career as a singer. I don't want to think much about how to sing or the pronunciation of the English lyrics because I'm an Asian. What most important is that the pronunciation is clear and the messages [of the songs] are received [by them]..'"
—Siti Nurhaliza on her English pronunciation.

In an interview during Secretary Week in March 2011, she revealed that she was working on a fully English album, with six of 10 tracks having been recorded as early as late January of the same year.

For the first time, she worked under the management of What's Up Entertainment, which is owned by her stepson, Adib Khalid who is only 21 years old. Written and produced almost entirely by Christian Alexanda and Bryan Bouro, the tracks were mixed and mastered in various studios, including mixHaus studios in Los Angeles, Oasis Mastering in Burbank, California and WhyteHype Studios in Perth, Australia.

The idea behind the album began when Siti and her husband Datuk Seri Khalid Mohamad Jiwa visited her stepson's recording company, What's Up Entertainment, and expressed her interest in having few songs written by Alexanda (a recording artist under Adib's management). In less than two months, Alexanda finished writing 10 songs for Siti, and he and Bouro monitored Siti's English pronunciation throughout the recording process while maintaining her "Voice of Asia" identity. Apart from solo tracks, All Your Love also featured vocals from Alexanda, in "I'll Wait Forever", as well as Sean Kingston, who is featured in the final track of the album, "Remember You". Some consideration was given to featuring Pitbull on the album, but owing to financial constraints the idea was dropped.

== Artwork and title ==
The main album cover is said to be influenced by the work of Andy Warhol with its brightly coloured hues and stylised portrait of the singer. When she was asked why she choose "All Your Love" as the title, she said, "The title of the album is dedicated to all my fans, my family and friends who have been so supportive of me over the years. I want to make them proud by producing an album that could potentially break into the international market."

== Release and promotion ==
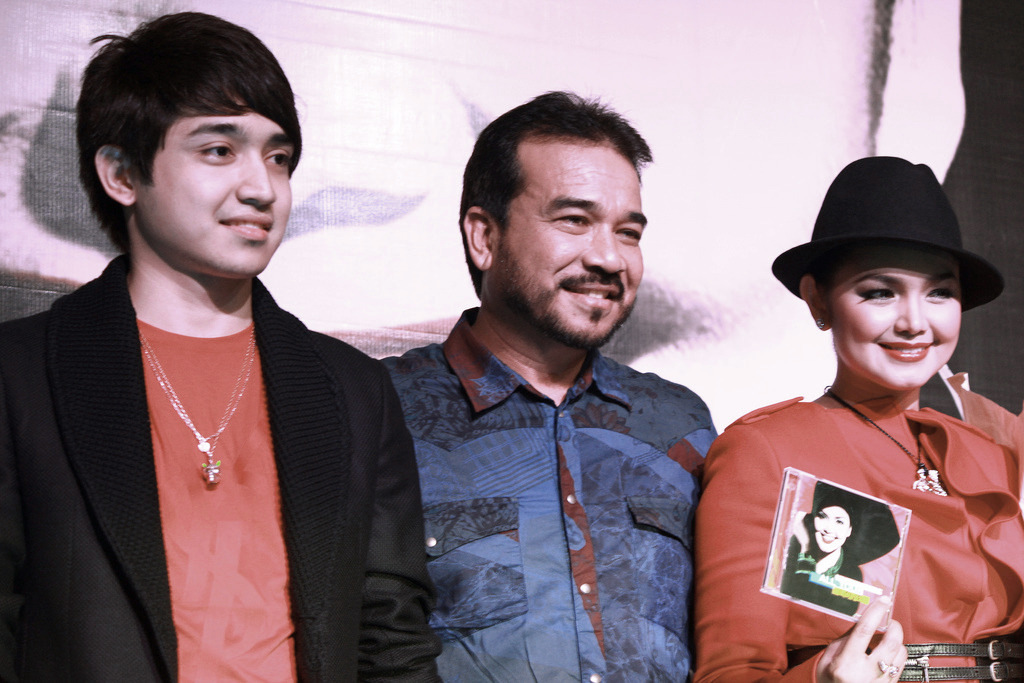
Siti Nurhaliza with her husband, Datuk Seri Khalid and her stepson, Adib Khalid at the launch

Although the official release for the physical version date was set on 26 September 2011, All Your Love was already available to the market as early as 24 September; it sold over 3000 copies from that first print and so far has sold more than 70 000 units as of March 2012. The album's digital version however was released 10 days earlier and it was Siti's first album to be digitally released through iTunes. The album was officially released on 26 September, at Shook Restaurant, Starhill Gallery, Bukit Bintang. She also promoted her album through several television programmes including on Bella and Hello on Two on ntv7 and TV2 respectively. For the promotion of her second single, she toured several major shopping malls in Malaysia including The Curve and One Utama Shopping Centre on 10 and 16 March respectively.

=== Live performances ===
The first single from this album, "Falling in Love", which has a "strong fusion of fresh Eurodance and Spanish Flamenco", debuted in one of her promotional concerts for SimplySiti in UiTM on 9 July 2011. A week later, she performed it to audience from Malaysia, Singapore and Indonesia at the 10th Anugerah Planet Muzik. She then performed the single for the third time in her own Aidilfitri-themed television program, Gegar Raya Kampung Pening Lalat, on 2 September 2011. She has also performed "Falling in Love" and "Remember You" live during Singapore's Countdown 2012 at Marina Bay, Singapore on 31 December 2011 and on 2 March, "Remember You" was officially released and premiered during her live interview with Fly FM.

== Singles ==
- The first single, "Falling In Love" was released on 9 July 2011 and the whole music video for the single was recorded on 12 September 2011 in five hours, around the entrance of Pavilion. The music video, directed by Khairul Azmi with the concept of flashmob employed over 200 dancers where mostly are her fans. The music video for "Falling In Love" premiered on 13 October 2011 on MTV Asia's official website.
- The second single, "Remember You" was released on 2 March 2012.

== Track listing ==
No.	Title	Writer(s)	Producer(s)	Length
1.	"All Your Love"	Christian Alexanda	Bryan Bouro, Christian Alexanda	4:37
2.	"Nobody Else"	Christian Alexanda, Bryan Bouro	Bryan Bouro	3:53
3.	"Tonight"	Christian Alexanda, Bryan Bouro	Bryan Bouro	4:09
4.	"All Over Again"	Christian Alexanda, Bryan Bouro	Bryan Bouro	3:26
5.	"I'll Wait Forever" (featuring Christian Alexanda)	Christian Alexanda, Bryan Bouro	Bryan Bouro	4:23
6.	"Falling in Love"	Christian Alexanda, Bryan Bouro	Bryan Bouro	3:02
7.	"I Cry Out"	Christian Alexanda, Bryan Bouro	Bryan Bouro	4:51
8.	"Fight for Love"	Christian Alexanda, Bryan Bouro	Bryan Bouro	4:15
9.	"Stand Up"	Christian Alexanda, Bryan Bouro, Tom Diesel, Ron E Jones	Bryan Bouro, Tom Diesel	4:56
10.	"Remember You" (featuring Sean Kingston)	Christian Alexanda	Bryan Bouro	5:25
Total length:				42:57

== Personnel ==
Credits adapted from All Your Love booklet liner notes.

- Christian Alexanda – songwriter, producer, vocals
- Bryan Bouro – songwriter, producer
- Richard Brown – assistant
- Tom Diesel – songwriter, producer, guitar
- Fendy – drums
- Richard Furch – engineer, mixing
- Annay H – stylist
- Ron E Jones – songwriter
- Adib Khalid – executive producer
- Sean Kingston – vocals
- Bustamam Mokhtar – photography
- Chris Patton – engineer, mixing
- Nizam Rahmat – creation
- Eddy Schreyer – mastering
- Nurul Shukor – make-up, hair stylist
- Shazwan Taib – creation
- Steve Thornton – percussion

== Awards ==
=== Intuned Music Awards ===
On 30 January 2012, All Your Love won the award for Best Album, and its first single, "Falling in Love" won the award for Best Music Video from Intuned Music Awards, which is an online award event where fans can cast their votes online for their favourites. For the inaugural event, with over 132 000 votes cast, Siti Nurhaliza won all seven awards out of seven nominations that she received.

Year	Nominee / work	Award	Result
2011		Favourite Artist	Won
2011		Best Female Solo (Female)	Won
2011		Most Promising Artist	Won
2011		Best Use of Social Media (Facebook/Twitter)	Won
2011		Sexiest Female Singer	Won
2011	All Your Love	Best Album	Won
2011	"Falling in Love"	Best Music Video	Won

=== Anugerah Industri Muzik (Music Industry Awards) ===
On 3 October 2012, two of the songs from the album were nominated for two different categories for the 19th Anugerah Industri Muzik and it was her first time ever to be nominated with English songs instead of her Malay songs.

Year	Nominee / work	Award	Result
2012	"I Cry Out"	Best Vocal Performance in a Song (Female)	Nominated
2012	"Stand Up"	Best Local English Song	Nominated

== Release history ==
Region	Release date	Format	Label
Malaysia	16 September 2011	digital download	What's Up Entertainment
Malaysia	26 September 2011	CD	What's Up Entertainment
