= Cahaya Hati =

Indonesian drama television series

- Genre: Drama; Family
- Created by: MNC Pictures
- Screenplay by: Aufaa Qianzi (Episodes 1—57); Ashvery Kumar (Episodes 58—189)
- Story by: Aufaa Qianzi (Episodes 1—57); Ashvery Kumar (Episodes 58—189)
- Directed by: Doddy Djanas
- Starring: Alwi Assegaf; Audrey Junicka; Hamas Syahid; Febby Rastanty; Zikri Daulay; Yunita Siregar; Teddy Syah; Rey Bong; Dwi Yan; Zayyan Sakha
- Theme music composer: Cakra Khan & Siti Nurhaliza
- Opening theme: Seluruh Cinta — Cakra Khan & Siti Nurhaliza
- Ending theme: Seluruh Cinta — Cakra Khan & Siti Nurhaliza
- Composer: Joseph S. Djafar
- Country of origin: Indonesia
- Original language: Indonesian
- No. of seasons: 1
- No. of episodes: 189

Production
- Producer: Masagus Fahri Fahrudin
- Production locations: Jakarta, Indonesia
- Cinematography: Haidar
- Editors: Andrie Kurniawan; Wahyudi; Dadang Ridwan; Anggang Wicaksono; Fernanda; Purnomo; Eko Jambo
- Camera setup: Multi-camera
- Running time: 37—92 minutes
- Production company: MNC Pictures

Original release
- Network: RCTI
- Release: 31 July – 30 December 2017

Cahaya Hati (lit. 'Heart Light') is an Indonesian television drama series starring Alwi Assegaf, Audrey Junicka Putri, Hamas Syahid, Febby Rastanty, Zikri Daulay, and Yunita Siregar. It produced by MNC Pictures which premiered on 31 July 2017 on RCTI.

== Plot ==
Nothing less than the lives of Yusuf and Azizah. Both were raised in a loving family. Yusuf (Alwi Assegaf) grows into a handsome, pious, and good silat child while Azizah (Audrey Junicka Putri) grows more beautiful and adorable. Their parents tried to equip them with sufficient religious knowledge because the village where they lived was filled with people who committed immorality. Starting from gambling, cockfighting, and other things that are prohibited by religion.

Happiness stopped for a moment when a flash flood hit their village. Yusuf and Azizah were swept away by the current. Both of their parents who intend to save them turned out to have to go with the flow. Luckily, Yusuf managed to pull Azizah out of the floodwaters. Exhausted, they finally rested in a vehicle that unwittingly took them to Jakarta.

The disaster began. They separated in Jakarta. Azizah, found by Parman (Yadi Timo), a pickpocket. Out of compassion, Azizah is finally invited to live with his wife, Leha (Rita Hamzah). Azizah was renamed by them to Love. Meanwhile, Yusuf is found by Barong (Reza Pahlevi), a thug who sells liquor. Yusuf and Azizah's new life is in stark contrast to the teachings of their parents.

== Cast ==
- Alwi Assegaf as Yusuf/Davi
- Audrey Junicka Putri as Azizah/Kasih
- Hamas Syahid as Yusuf/Davi
- Febby Rastanty as Azizah/Kasih
- Zikri Daulay as Galih
- Yunita Siregar as Flo
- Teddy Syah as Sulaiman
- Novi Bunga as Amanda
- Eksanti as Siti/Nur
- Yadi Timo as Parman
- Rita Hamzah as Leha
- Krisna Murti Wibowo as Cahyadi
- Rama Michael as Afandi
- Mufida Omar Nahdi as Jihan
- Lidi Brugman as Vita
- Elryan Carlen as Evan
- Baron Yusuf Siregar as Toro
- Sissy Firman as Fatimeh
- Zayyan Sakha as Didit
- Marsha Aurelia as Luna
- Rafael Putra Ismy as Alif
- Rey Bong as Rio
- Rayhan Salman as Beno
- Rezqi Alfarezi as Jojo
- Cinta Adelia as Annisa
- Muhammad Riza as Wira
- Farell Akbar as Raffa
- Herdin Hidayat as Harun
- Reza Pahlevi as Barong
- Jeanenit Iswara as Della
- Eno TB as Aliya
- Ferdi Ali as Lutfi
- Sheila Alexander as Vira
- Teuku Mirza as Ringgo
- Ira Ilva Sari as Rani
- Krisni Dieta as Aminah
- Dwi Yan as Surya
- Marissa Christina as Nadia
- Gary Iskak as Johan
- Ciara Nadine Brosnan as Jihan
- Alvino Habibi as Galih
- Firdaus Regaldin as Toro
- Oding Siregar as Mr. Gan
- Revi Atqiya as Ijul
- Denny Firdaus as Murad
- Lifia Laeticia as Lifia
- Emmie Lemu as Emmie

== Productions ==
=== Casting ===
In December 2017, the makers decided to introduce a time-leap in the show and Hamas Syahid, Febby Rastanty and Zikri Daulay was cast to play adult Yusuf, Azizah and Galih.

=== Filming ===
On 3 September 2017 the show completed 50 episodes. The show have a timeslot change from 6.15 pm to 10.15 pm to pave the way for a show Buaya Putih from 11 December 2017.

== Reception ==
In the first episode, is in third place with TVR 3.6 and audience share 15.3%.

== Awards and nominations ==
Year	Award	Category	Recipient	Result
2017	Silet Awards 2017	Best Show	Cahaya Hati	Nominated
2017	Silet Awards 2017	Best Child Actor	Alwi Assegaf	Won
2017	Silet Awards 2017	Best Child Actress	Audrey Junicka Putri	Nominated
2017	Silet Awards 2017	Best Theme Song	Seluruh Cinta by Cakra Khan & Siti Nurhaliza	Won
