= Kampung Awah =

Coordinates: 3°30′N 102°32′E

Kampung Awah is a small village in mukim Bukit Segumpal, Pahang, Malaysia. This village is located about 18 kilometres from Temerloh town and 35 kilometres from Maran town. It also a birthplace of the renowned Malaysian singer and actress, Dato' Sri Siti Nurhaliza.

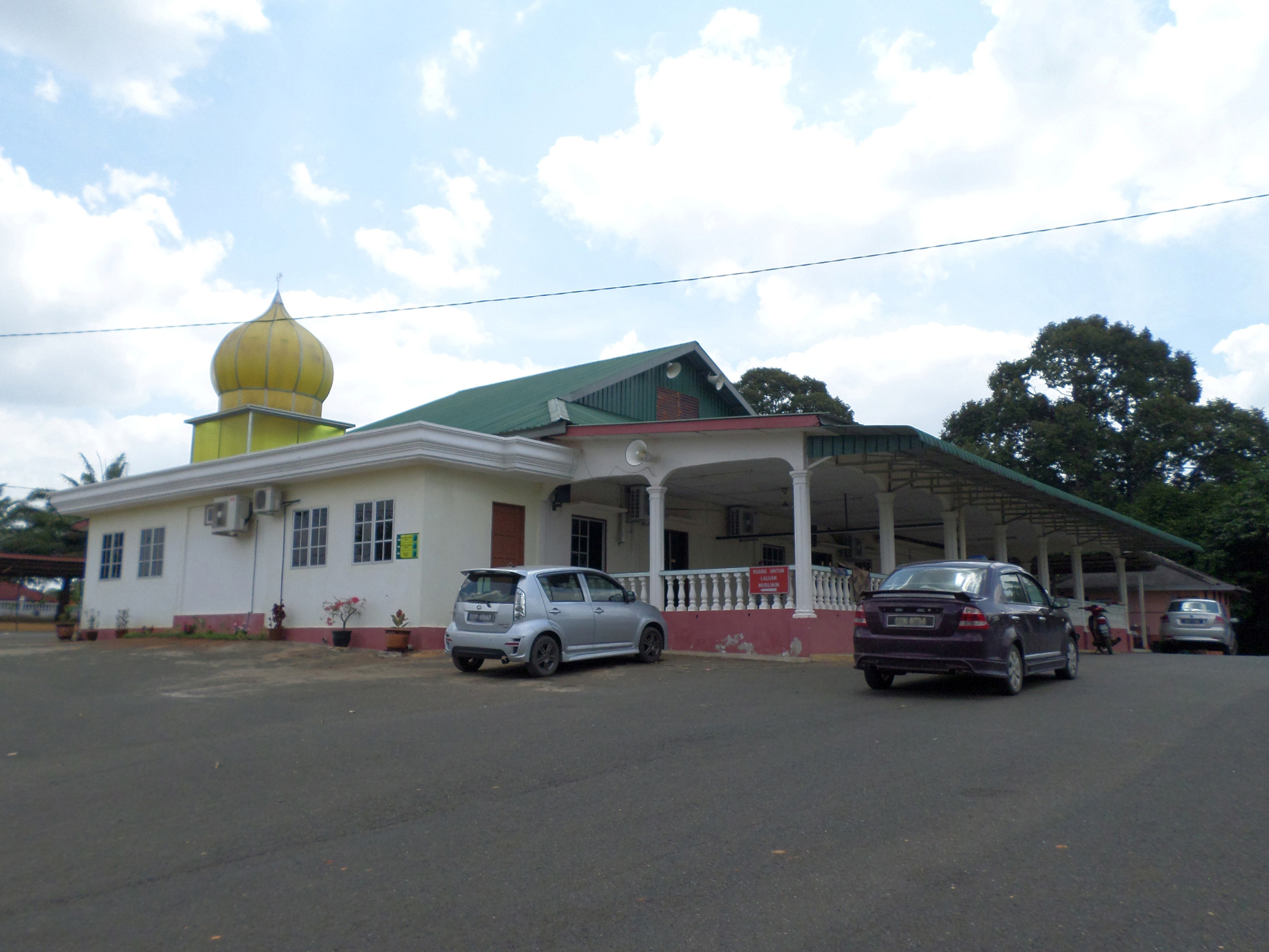
Kampung Awah At-Taqwa Mosque

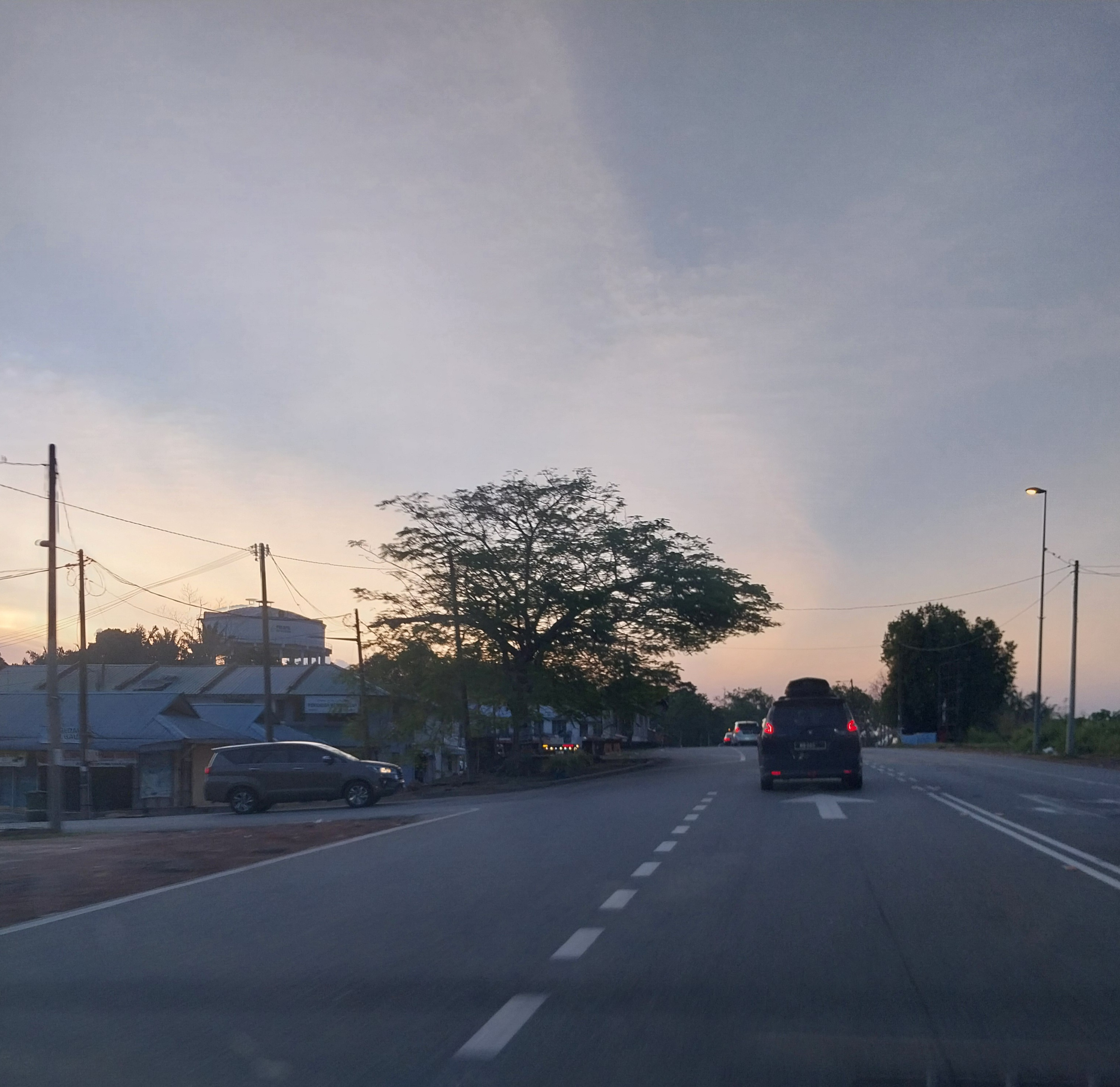
Kampung Awah shop lot

== See also ==
- Pahang
