= Satu (concert) =

2009 concert tour by Siti Nurhaliza

SATU Konsert Eksklusif Dato' Siti Nurhaliza
- Concert by Siti Nurhaliza
- Official promotional poster
- Location: Kuala Lumpur, Malaysia
- Venue: Istana Budaya
- Start date: 26 June 2009
- End date: 28 June 2009
- Legs: 1
- No. of shows: 3 in Asia

Siti Nurhaliza concert chronology
- Diari Hati Siti Nurhaliza (2008); SATU Konsert Eksklusif Dato' Siti Nurhaliza (2009)

SATU Konsert Eksklusif Dato' Siti Nurhaliza (referred to it as SATU; Malay: The One) is the sixth concert and the eighth solo concert by Malaysian pop singer Siti Nurhaliza to support her thirteenth studio album, Lentera Timur and in conjunction with the Father's Day on 21 June. This concert is her first colossal theatrical concert.

== Background ==
SATU was her first colossal theatrical concert. The name of her concert is a Malay word that literally means "one", inspired by 'Satu Malaysia' or '1Malaysia' introduced by Malaysian Prime Minister, Datuk Seri Najib Tun Razak, a call for unity. The idea for a concert came while she was practising her performance at Anugerah Bintang Popular Berita Harian 08. The concept of this concert was inspired from A New Day... by Celine Dion. More than 30 songs have been performed in full and medley and in new arrangement.

== Concert synopsis ==
The whole concert was meant to portray songs and Siti Nurhaliza's highs and lows after more than a decade of singing and to recap the singer's road to fame. Their concert also had some scenes highlighting her romance with her husband, Datuk Khalid Muhammad Jiwa.

They were more 25 dancers and 20 musicians who were accompanying Siti Nurhaliza throughout the show.

== Opening acts ==
Aizat (26 June 2009)

- Hanya Engkau Yang Mampu
- Fikirkanlah
- Engkau Bagai Permata (Siti Nurhaliza's cover song)
- Heal the World (Michael Jackson's cover song)

== Set list ==
Act 1: The Opening

- Kurniaan Dalam Samaran

Act 2: Medley 1: Ballads

- Tanpa Dendam di Hati
- Dialah di Hati
- Mulanya Cinta
- Hati
- Seindah Biasa

Act 3: Medley 2: Hit Songs

- Sutra Maya
- Jerat Percintaan
- Aku Cinta Padamu
- Purnama Merindu
- Kau Kekasihku
- Percayalah
- Bukan Cinta Biasa.

Act 4: Medley 3: Traditional

- Cindai
- Balqis
- Nirmala
- Bulan Yang Mesra.

Act 5: Upbeat

- Pendirianku
- Ku Mahu
- Debaran Cinta
- Wanita
- Ku Milikmu

Act 6: Siti Zone Fan Request

- Cuba Untuk Mengerti
- Bila Harus Memilih

Act 7: Love Songs

- Siti Situ Sana Sini
- Cahaya Cinta
- Di Taman Teman
- Biarlah Rahsia (dedicated to her media friends who relentlessly pursued her love story back when she was single)
- Destinasi Cinta

== Tour dates ==
Date	City	Country	Venue
Asia
26 June 2009	Kuala Lumpur	Malaysia	Istana Budaya
27 June 2009	Kuala Lumpur	Malaysia	Istana Budaya
28 June 2009	Kuala Lumpur	Malaysia	Istana Budaya

== Personnel ==
- Tour producer: Siti Nurhaliza Production
- Tour director: Pat Ibrahim
- Musical director: Aubrey Suwito
- Choreographers: Pat Ibrahim and team
- Costume design & sponsor: Amir Luqman, Michael Ong, Rizman Ruzaini
- Tour Sponsor: Yayasan Nurjiwa, Maxis, Jakel
