= Dato' Sri Siti Nurhaliza On Tour =

2019 concert tour by Siti Nurhaliza

- Asian tour by Siti Nurhaliza
- Location: Kuala Lumpur, Malaysia; Singapore; Jakarta, Indonesia
- Venue: Axiata Arena, Kuala Lumpur; Singapore Expo, Singapore; Istora Senayan, Jakarta
- Start date: 21 February 2019
- End date: 16 March 2019
- No. of shows: 3
- Attendance: 3,000 (Indonesia); 4,500 (Singapore); 12,000 (Malaysia)
- Budget: 10 million MYR

Siti Nurhaliza concert chronology
- Dato' Siti Nurhaliza & Friends Concert (2016); Dato' Sri Siti Nurhaliza On Tour (2019); Sebuah Epitome: Saya Siti Nurhaliza (2024)

Dato' Sri Siti Nurhaliza On Tour is a mini concert tour by Malaysian singer Siti Nurhaliza. The Southeast Asian tour was held on February 21 to March 16, 2019, to coincide with 24th anniversary of Siti's musical career. Estimated at a budget about RM10 million, Siti Nurhaliza on Tour was touted as the most expensive concerts in the Malaysian entertainment history. Siti went on planned to embark her concert tour in London which scheduled in April.

== Background ==
The concert was announced by Siti during the concert's press conference on 18 December 2018. She discloses that the organizer, Shiraz Projects, was to receive any sponsorships openly to any parties for her concert, which was slated to tour four countries by 2019. She commented: "I’m blessed that the organiser behind the tour (Shiraz Project), has arranged for vocal training sessions from the very best. There’s always room for improvement in anything you do, even if you’ve been doing it for a long time,".

== Tour dates ==
Date	City	Country	Venues	Attendance
Asia
21 February 2019	Jakarta	Indonesia	Istora Senayan	3,000
2 March 2019	Singapore City	Singapore	Singapore Expo	4,500
16 March 2019	Kuala Lumpur	Malaysia	Axiata Arena	12,000

== See also ==
- List of Siti Nurhaliza concert tours
