= Cristian Alexanda =

Australian R&B singer from Perth

- Born: Christian Alexander Wancer; Perth, Western Australia, Australia
- Origin: Perth, Western Australia
- Genres: R&B
- Occupation: Singer-songwriter
- Years active: 2004–present
- Label: Urban Sounds Entertainment/ Central Station (2004–present)
- Website: cristianalexanda.com

Cristian Alexanda is an Australian R&B singer from Perth. In 2003 and 2004, he has supported a number of well-known acts on their Australian tours including 50 Cent, G-Unit and Sean Paul and Justin Timberlake.

== Life and career ==
=== 2004–2007: Cristyle ===
His first single "Misunderstood" was released on 24 May 2004. It peaked at 24 on the ARIA Charts. "Misunderstood' was a very popular club and radio anthem in Australia and was certified gold in 2005. The song was taken from his debut album Cristyle produced by The Ignorants and Blacksmith, who had also produced tracks for Blue and Craig David.

The second single "Party Anthem" was released in July 2004 and debuted at number 19.

Alexanda said in later interviews for his second album, Urban Nature, that his party lifestyle while writing and recording his 1st album made him draw inspiration from other places inside of him. Cristyle was released in early 2005 but had minimal promotion due to a rift between his management label, Legit Music, and marketing/distribution giant Liberation / Mushroom Music. Label owner Michael Gudinski, known for discovering Kylie Minogue and furthering the career of Jimmy Barnes, has said Alexanda is one of the most talented and energetic young performers he's seen in recent years. Music media giant Molly Meldrum has also had high praises for Alexanda, saying that his album, Cristyle was the best album released in summer 2004/2005. Later that year in June, he supported Justin Timberlake on the Australian leg of the Justified & Stripped Tour. The second single was Party Anthem.

=== 2007–2009: Urban Nature ===
Cristian spent majority of 2007–2008 recording his third album both in Australia and the United States. All songs for the album were written by Alexanda, now Alexander, and produced by the most popular producers in Australia. The album features collaborations from U.S. rapper/actor Ja Rule, who made his first rap appearance in years after retiring to pursue acting. The song "Too Fine" featuring Ja Rule, was realised in April 2008 The album also features U.S. platinum rapper Fabolous on "Something About You". It was never released as a single due to a meltdown at Fabolous's record label Def Jam, and no video was produced for it. The second single "Won't Let You Go" was highly praised by the Australian music media. Due to a company fold from Central Station Records going bankrupt, the album's distributor, "Won't Let You Go" and "Stay With Me" were rush as single releases with no promotion. The album was never physically released and is only available on iTunes and in stores in Japan. Alexander quickly moved on to his next project "Revolution" recorded for Zhenya Records.

=== 2009–present: Later career ===
In 2010, Cristian moved to Kuala Lumpur, Malaysia, to write and co-produce an album for Asian musician Siti Nurhaliza. It was her first ever English album. Cristian wrote and produced the album with past collaborator Bryan B (Urban Nature). Cristian also wrote the collaboration with Sean Kingston on the song titled "Remember You". As the album was set to be released, Cristian abruptly left the record company Whats Up Entertainment citing creative differences with the company heads. He then quickly moved on to his next project, another solo album called Born Again Cristian. The meaning behind the album is a rebirth of the artist after he told Malaysian interviewers the music is like nothing he's heard before.

== Discography ==
=== Albums ===
Title	Details
Cristyle	Released: 24 May 2004; Label: Urban Sounds Entertainment
Urban Nature	Released: July 2009; Label: Central Station Records

=== Singles ===
Year	Title	Chart positions	Album
Year	Title	AUS	Album
2004	"Misunderstood"	24	Cristyle
2004	"Party Anthem"	19	Cristyle
2008	"Too Fine" (featuring Ja Rule)	38	Urban Nature
