= Siti Nurhaliza =

Malaysian singer-songwriter and actress (born 1979)

Biduanita Negara Yang Hormat Dato' Sri Hajah Siti Nurhaliza SSAP DIMP JSM SAP PMP AAP
- سيتي نورهاليزا
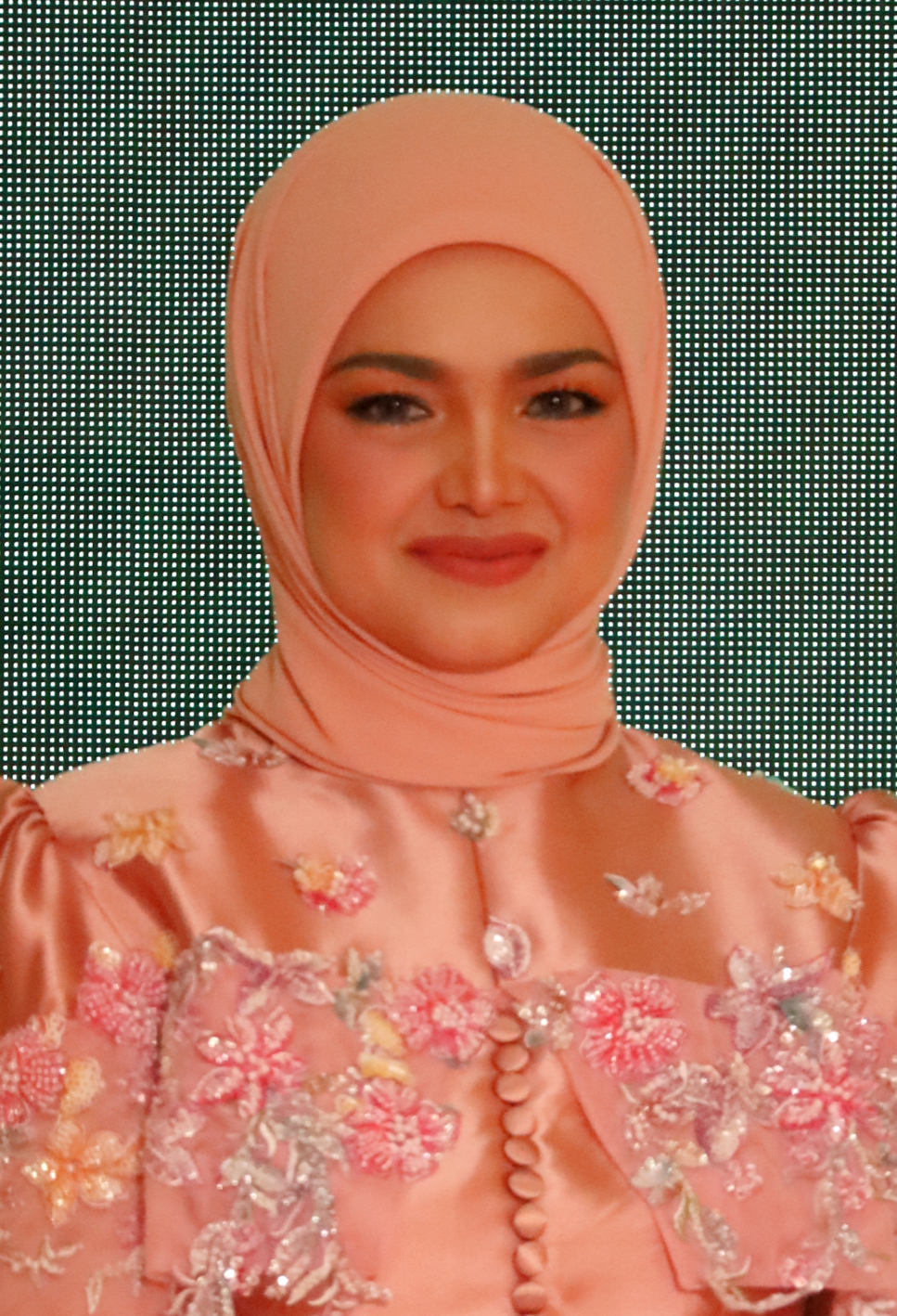
- Siti Nurhaliza in 2025
- Born: Siti Nurhaliza binti Tarudin; 11 January 1979 (age 47); Kampung Awah, Pahang, Malaysia
- Occupations: Singer; songwriter; composer; lyricist; producer; actress
- Years active: 1995–present
- Spouse: Khalid bin Mohamad Jiwa (m. 2006)
- Children: 2
- Awards: See full list
- Musical career
- Genres: Pop; Irama Malaysia; R&B; rock; soft rock; soul
- Instrument: Vocals
- Labels: Suria Records; Siti Nurhaliza Productions; SN Legacy; What's Up Entertainment; Universal Music Malaysia
- Website: Siti Nurhaliza on Instagram

Siti Nurhaliza binti Tarudin (Jawi: سيتي نورهاليزا بنت تارودين, [ˈsiti nʊrhaˈliza ˈbinti taˈrudɪn]; born 11 January 1979) is a Malaysian singer, composer, lyricist, songwriter, and actress. Referred to as the "Voice of Asia", she is regarded as one of the most influential artists in the Malay world. She has recorded songs in multiple languages, including Malay, English, Arabic, Mandarin, Japanese, and Tamil.

Siti debuted at age 16 after winning a local singing competition show, Bintang HMI, in 1995. Her debut single, "Jerat Percintaan", won the 11th Anugerah Juara Lagu and two awards for Best Performance and Best Ballad. It was later included in her self-titled debut studio album (1996), which sold over 800,000 copies in Malaysia. Her self-titled sophomore album (1997) was similarly successful, selling over 400,000 copies in the country and over 500,000 copies in Indonesia, and was certified 6× Platinum by the Recording Industry Association of Malaysia (RIM).

In 1998, Siti performed during the closing ceremony of 1998 Commonwealth Games in front of Queen Elizabeth II and Prince Philip. In 2001, Siti's record sales contributed to ten percent of Malaysia's total album sales of that year. Her concert at the Bukit Jalil National Stadium in 2004 drew around 70,000 people, making it the most-attended concert in Kuala Lumpur until Coldplay surpassed it in 2023. In 2005, Siti became the first Southeast Asian singer, and third Asian singer to perform a solo concert at the Royal Albert Hall, London with accompaniment from the London Symphony Orchestra. That same year, she was listed second by MTV Asia in Asia's Best Musical Artiste and was named as the Biggest Asian Artiste by Channel V.

Siti is one of the best-selling recording artists in Malaysian history, having sold over six million copies of her albums. Four of her albums are among the best-selling albums of all time in the country. Her various accolades include 42 Anugerah Industri Muzik, 31 Anugerah Bintang Popular, 28 Anugerah Planet Muzik, 22 Anugerah Juara Lagu, four MTV Asia Awards, three World Music Awards, two Anugerah Musik Indonesia, and five records in the Malaysia Book of Records. She was voted Most Popular Regional Artiste for ten consecutive years between 2001 and 2011 in the Anugerah Planet Muzik, and was named one of the world's 500 Most Influential Muslims from 2015 to 2024. She was named Biduanita Negara (National Songstress) at the 2024 National Arts Awards, making her the third artist to have received the honor after Saloma and Datuk Sharifah Aini.

== Early life ==
Siti Nurhaliza was born on 11 January 1979, in Berek Polis (police barrack) Kampung Awah in Temerloh, Pahang, Malaysia. She is the fourth child in a family of seven siblings born to housewife Siti Salmah Bachik and police officer Tarudin Ismail. She comes from a musically inclined family; her brother, Saiful Bahri Tarudin, and her sisters, Siti Norsaida and Siti Nursairah are also singers. Her maternal grandfather was a famous violinist, and her mother used to be a local traditional singer.

During her childhood, she was involved in various school activities including sports and co-curricular activities. She attended preschool at Tabika Perkep, Balai Polis Kampung Awah, Temerloh where she first showcased her early singing talent at the age of six when she sang "Sirih Pinang", a Malay traditional song, at her kindergarten's certificate-receiving event. She attended primary school at Sekolah Rendah Kebangsaan Clifford and received her secondary education at Sekolah Menengah Kebangsaan Clifford, Kuala Lipis, Pahang. In 1991, when she was 12 years old, she won one of her earliest singing competitions, with the song "Bahtera Merdeka" at the Merdeka Day Singing Contest, a local patriotic song competition. During her schooling years, she was active in sports, especially in netball. She participated in two different sports events – netball and 5x80 meter relay – during the Fiesta Media Idola 2006 in Kuantan. She was also chosen as one of the torch bearers to light the games of the Fiesta, marking its opening alongside Malaysian actress, Fasha Sandha.

Coming from a modest family, at the age of nine, Siti had to wake up at 4:00 am to help her mother make and sell various homemade kuih in her neighbourhood, where sometimes, she also had to carry a makeshift table down three flights of stairs to the main road to set up a small stall. She has commented that the hardships of her childhood have helped her to be more frugal when spending and to be more confident when communicating with the public. She has also joked that the experiences helped to improve her vocal skills, as she has to shout to call for customers. Apart from participating in singing competitions, she also used to follow her uncle, Abdul Rahim Bachik, to invitational shows like wedding ceremonies and dinner parties, which exposed her to performing live.

Although she had good SPM results, Siti Nurhaliza declined to pursue her tertiary education to focus solely on her music career. In a 2012 interview, Siti said that she did not regret not obtaining a university degree as none of her family pursued higher education due to financial difficulties.

== Career ==
=== Early commercial success (1995–1996) ===
"Jerat Percintaan" (1996)
Siti Nurhaliza's single that managed to win the 11th Anugerah Juara Lagu.

Siti Nurhaliza's family performed at many public local ceremonies in their hometown, such as weddings and public soirées. At the age of two, Siti began to learn traditional songs from her mother, which she would later perform during special occasions and events.

She was the vocalist for 'Family Group', a small band founded by her uncle, Abdul Rahim Bachik. She improved her singing skills by participating in numerous local singing competitions. When she was 14, she auditioned for Asia Bagus but failed to go through. Despite her frustration, she did not give up. Two years later, she participated in 1995 RTM Bintang HMI competition at the age of 16 where she auditioned with a song made famous by Ruth Sahanaya, "Kaulah Segalanya". In the competition, she met Adnan Abu Hassan, the music composer who tutored and helped her with her vocal performance, before she finally won the contest with the song by Aishah, "Camar Yang Pulang". She signed a contract with Suria Records, rejecting four other offers from different international recording companies, including Sony Music, BMG Music and Warner Music. In April 1996, Suria Records released her debut and first eponymous album. Her first single, "Jerat Percintaan", won the 11th Anugerah Juara Lagu that same year. In 1996 she also won Most Popular Television Entertainer, Most Popular Female Singer, Most Popular Teen Artiste and the top award Most Popular Star in Anugerah Bintang Popular.

=== Career development (1997–1998) ===
In 1997, Siti began gaining traction in Indonesia's music industry after her story appeared in the April 1997 issue of POS Kota, one of the most popular magazines in Indonesia. This was also impactful due to the difficulty foreign artists faced in breaking into Indonesia's music industry. Siti was reportedly the first Malaysian singer to hold a live concert on Indosiar, a popular nationwide television station in Indonesia. She held a series of large-scale concerts in Jakarta, Bandung, Yogyakarta, and other Indonesian cities over the next few years. In 1997, she won Best New Artist and Best Song (Jerat Percintaan) from Anugerah Industri Muzik 1997.

On 12 January 1998, one day after turning 19, she launched her own company, Siti Nurhaliza Productions (M) Sdn. Bhd. which acts as her official management team. During the 1998 Commonwealth Games, which were held in Kuala Lumpur, Malaysia, she performed in front of Queen Elizabeth II and her consort, Prince Philip among other dignitaries and officials from 70 Commonwealth countries. She also shared the same stage with international stars Céline Dion and Rod Stewart during the closing ceremony. The ceremony was televised in 70 nations worldwide, introducing her to the wider international arena. In November of that year, she was invited to perform in Japan for five days at the Pop Queen Festival, also known as Saga Fiesta '98.

=== Early international stardom (1999–2005) ===
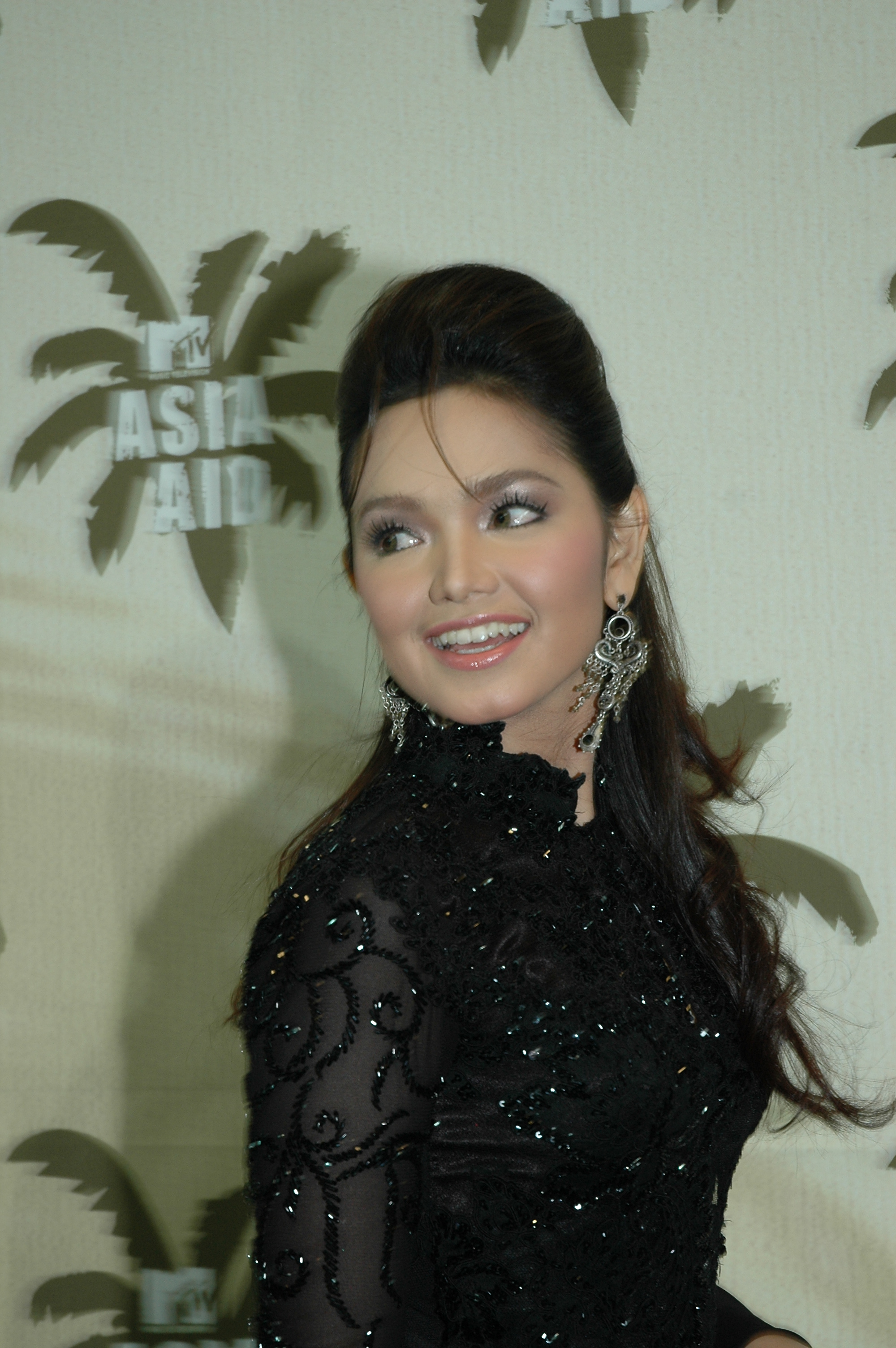
Siti Nurhaliza attending the red carpet ceremony of the MTV Asia Aid 2005 in Bangkok on 3 February 2005.

In May 1999, she took part in South Pacific International Song and Singing Competition 1999, held in Gold Coast, Queensland, Australia, where she won first place in the category of 'Pop/Top 40 for International Song' with her single, "We'll Be As One". Siti also won Best Female Vocal Performance with the same single, although the judges based their decision on the cassette tape/compact disc sent by her recording company to the organiser and rather than a live performance.

In December 1999, Siti competed in Shanghai Asia Music Festival 1999, where she won the Gold Award for the Asia New Singer Competition. She was also invited back to the competition in 2000 and 2002 as a featuring artiste.

For the next few years, Siti took part in 'Voice of Asia 2002' which was held in Kazakhstan, where she performed one of her singles from her third album, Purnama Merindu and managed to grab the Grand Prix Champion title, the ultimate prize. That year, Siti was also invited to perform a tribute concert for the late Sudirman Hj Arshad at Istana Budaya in Kuala Lumpur.

In December 2003, she was invited to perform at 2003 Japan and ASEAN Pop Stars Dream Concert 2003 (J-ASEAN Pops 2003), held in Yokohama, Japan, alongside top Japan and ASEAN artists, including THE BOOM, You Hitoto, INSPi, Leonard Eto, Yuri Chika, Hiroshi Takano and Hideki Kurosawa from Japan. Other ASEAN artists included were Hans Anwar & Lo'Ryder (Brunei), Preap Sowat (Cambodia), AB Three (Indonesia), Alexandra (Laos), Lay Phyu & Iron Cross (Myanmar), Jolina Magdangal (Philippines), Tanya Chua (Singapore), Briohny (Thailand) and Lam Truong (Vietnam). For the concert, a special song was composed by a Japanese composer, Kazufumi Miyazawa with lyrics by a Singaporean lyricist, Dick Lee entitled, Treasure the World. The same song was also sung by each singer from each participating country in their native languages, where Siti's version which was in Malay, entitled Dunia Milik Kita was also performed for the first time during the event.

In 2004, Siti was the first non-Chinese artiste to be invited to perform at Taiwan's Golden Melody Awards. Apart from performing a solo cover of Na Ying's single "征服" (English: Conquer), she and Leehom Wang sang Teresa Teng's "The Moon Represents My Heart" as duet, and was an award presenter alongside Taiwanese news anchor Patty Hou. She also appeared on a half-hour special program by Azio TV during her brief four days in Taipei. On her third appearance at the MTV Asia Awards, held in Singapore, she performed with British singer Gareth Gates for the second time, singing Gate's song "Say It Isn't So".

Beginning in 2004, her company, Siti Nurhaliza Production (M) Sdn. Bhd. (SNP), produced television programs. Their first musical program, Muzikal Aidiladha (Musical of Eid Al-Adha), was released during Eid al-Adha. The company's second release was Siti Nurhaliza 3D (Siti Nurhaliza Dari Dalam Diri), a 13-episode reality television series about the private life of Siti Nurhaliza which aired on RTM, the Malaysian public broadcasting network. That year, SNP also produced Sukan dan Selebriti (Sports and Celebrities), a 26-episode program featuring popular artists and sports personalities.

In 2005, Alicia Keys introduced her as The Voice of Asia during the MTV Asia Aid in 2005 held in Bangkok, Thailand due to her powerful vocal, and her outstanding achievements locally and internationally. In April of that year, Siti held a successful solo concert at the Royal Albert Hall in London, although the majority of the audience were Malaysians living in the United Kingdom. The concert was also attended by the Sultan and Sultanah of Pahang and royal families from Brunei. During the concert, she was backed by the London Symphony Orchestra conducted by Indonesian maestro, Erwin Gutawa. British press called her Asia's Celine Dion for her powerful vocal performance. Later that year, Channel V listed her as the Second Biggest Asian Artist for her achievements, behind Taiwanese singer Jay Chou. Similarly, MTV Asia rated her as Asia's Second Best Musical Artist, also ranking Jay Chou in first place.

=== Datukship and Transkripsi (2006–2007) ===
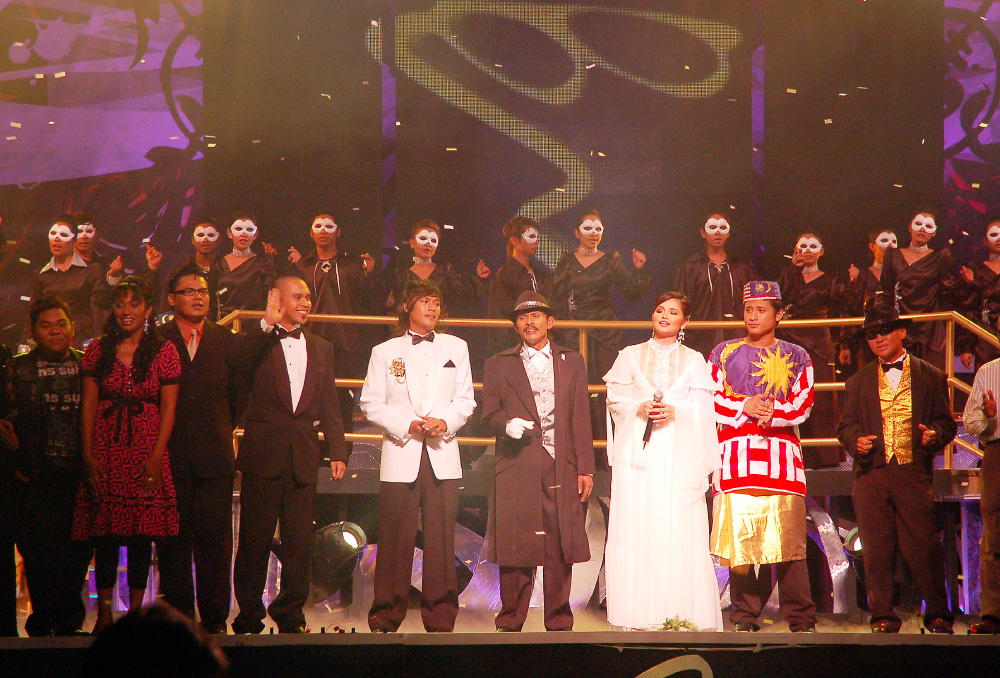
Siti Nurhaliza (in white) with fellow Malaysian singers during Konsert Suara Hati Sudirman Arshad in 2007.

Siti's eleventh studio album, Transkripsi, was released in April 2006 and contained contributions from producers and composers from Indonesia (Erwin Gutawa, Melly Goeslaw and Glenn Fredly) and Malaysia (Aubrey Suwito, Cat Farish, Jenny Chin, Firdaus Mahmud, Mac Chew, Yasin and Damian VE). Transkripsi became the year's best album after winning the Best Pop Album and Best Album categories in the Anugerah Industri Muzik. The album was the first to be produced under her own production company, and was well received by critics, who called it one of her best albums. On 24 October 2006, she was conferred as "Dato'" after receiving the title of Darjah Indera Mahkota Pahang (DIMP) from the Sultan of Pahang, Sultan Ahmad Shah on his 76th birthday alongside two Malaysian designers, Bernard Chandran and Dayang Tom Abang Saufi.

In February 2007, she made her first appearance at the Grammy Awards, where she was the first Malaysian to walk the red carpet. On 20 and 21 April 2007, she performed at Konsert Istana Cinta Nostalgia, a tribute concert for the late musicians P. Ramlee and Saloma at Istana Budaya, Kuala Lumpur. The concert featured popular songs composed by P. Ramlee, which were performed by Siti and other invited artists. On 30 April 2007, she garnered four nominations in the Anugerah Industri Muzik including Best Pop Album (Transkripsi), Best Vocal Female Performance in an Album (Transkripsi), Best Music Video (Bisakah) and Best Cover for an Album (Transkripsi). Out of the four nominations, she won two awards: Best Pop Album and Best Album for Transkripsi. She also received five nominations from Anugerah Planet Muzik 2007 for two categories that were voted by fans from Indonesia, Malaysia and Singapore – Most Popular Female Artist and Most Popular Song ("Biarlah Rahsia") – and three categories that were judged by professional juries and judges: Best Female Artist, Best Song (Biarlah Rahsia) and Best Album. She won three out of five: Most Popular Female Artist, Best Female Artist and Best Song.

=== Hadiah Daripada Hati, Lentera Timur and other works (2007–2008) ===
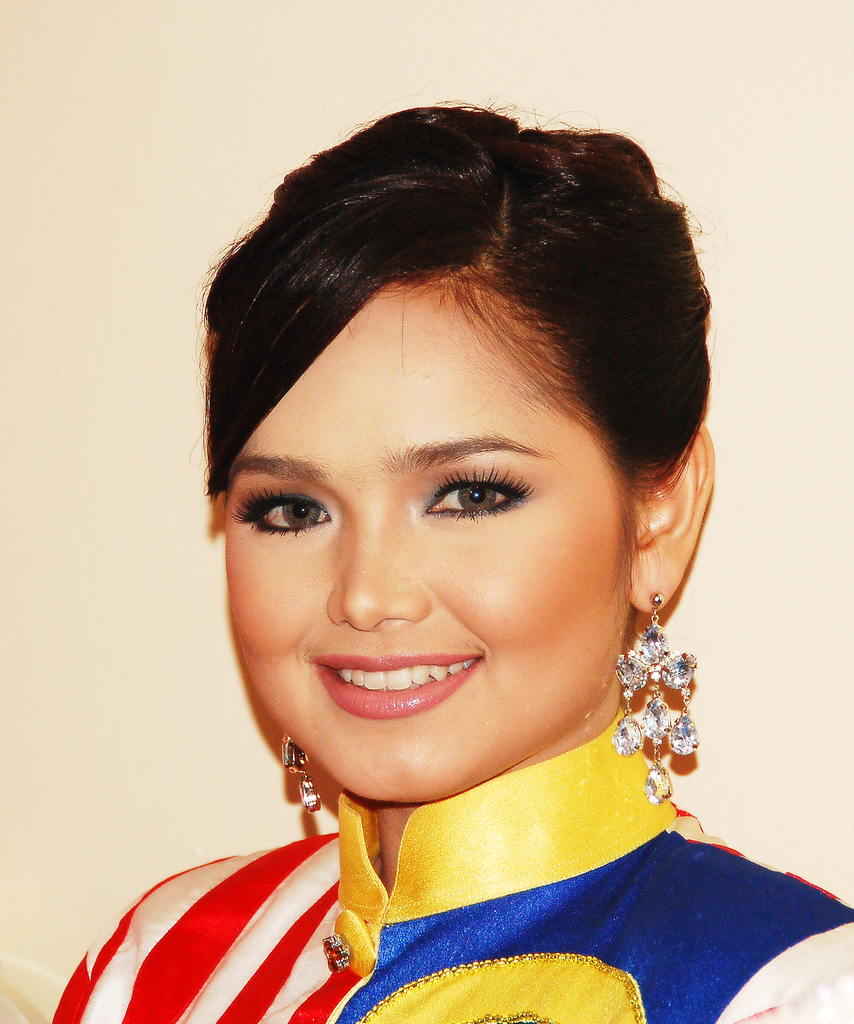
Siti Nurhaliza backstage during Konsert Suara Hati Sudirman Arshad, a tribute concert in April 2007.

In 2007, Siti recorded two songs for two different films, singing "Menanti Pasti" and "Hati" for Kayangan and 1957: Hati Malaya respectively. However, only "Hati" was included in her twelfth studio album, Hadiah Daripada Hati. It also received the award of Best Original Theme Song from Anugerah Festival Filem Malaysia ke-21 (21st Malaysian Film Festival) in 2008. The year also marked Siti's acting debut, as she performed as Azizah, P. Ramlee's mysterious lover, in the musical Remy ... Kisah P. Ramlee (Remy ... The Story of P. Ramlee), which was a tribute to the late P. Ramlee, staged at Istana Budaya from 19 October to 3 November 2007. Her acting debut also saw the debut of her third single "Mulanya Cinta", which was composed by Dick Lee, a Singaporean composer.

On 10 December 2007, Siti's twelfth studio album Hadiah Daripada Hati was released, with the Latin-influenced pop song "Ku Mahu" as the first single of this album and it was featured as the opening theme song for a local Malay drama, Spa-Q. Later, Melawan Kesepian was chosen as her second single and was the first track of this album to have a video clip. The song was a remake of a hit that was once popularised by an Indonesian band called Jikustik. The album was not well received by critics, who said it was a moderate performance from her and was not on the same par as her previous album Transkripsi, which was touted as the best album she had ever made. However, Hadiah Daripada Hati received five nominations in the 15th edition of AIM including Best Pop Album, Song of The Year, Best Vocal Performance in an Album (Female), Best Arrangement and Best Album Cover making Siti the second nominee with the most nominations after newcomer Faizal Tahir. Out of five categories including three multiple nominations for Best Arrangement category, the album earned her three awards for Best Pop Album, Best Musical Arrangement in a Song (Malay) for the song Cintamu as well as her ninth Best Vocal Performance in an Album (Female) in which she had lost to Jaclyn Victor the previous year. According to Google's 2007 Malaysia Year-End Zeitgeist, Siti was one of the most frequently searched persons on Google by Malaysian Google users, beating celebrities like Paris Hilton and Britney Spears.

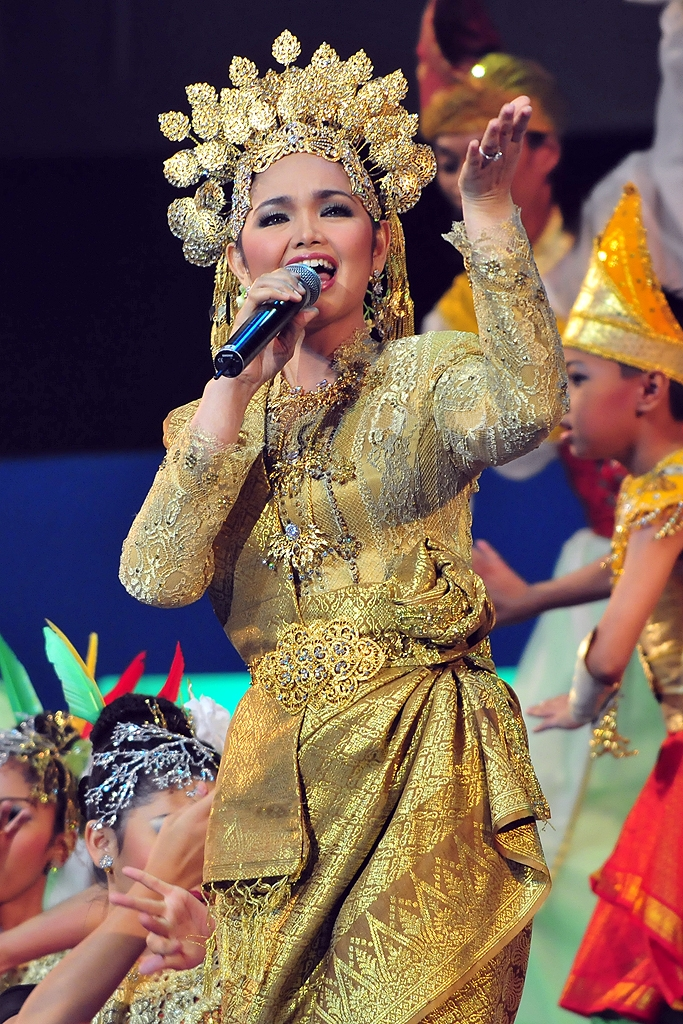
Siti Nurhaliza performing as the opening act for the Kuala Lumpur International Film Festival 2008.

In January 2008, she was titled one of Asia's Idols by Asia News Network for her achievements and status as an icon of Malaysian entertainment. On 21 March 2008, Siti held one of her first solo acoustic concerts at the Esplanade Theatre in Singapore. The concert was called Diari Hati – Dato' Siti Nurhaliza's Heart (Diary of Dato' Siti Nurhaliza's Heart) where she performed numbers of her hits from her latest album, Hadiah Daripada Hati and previous albums.

Her 13th album, Lentera Timur, was released on 26 December 2008. The album marked her most recent return to contemporary music since her 2002 album, Sanggar Mustika. She commented that the album has more modern and contemporary songs unlike her usual traditional genre. For Lentera Timur, she worked with multiple international composers, including Singapore's M. Nasir and Indonesia's Katon Bagaskara. The album's thirteen songs were created and composed in under three days. Nine of the songs came from a songwriting workshop, Cipta Ekspress – Berirama Malaysia, which was organised by Malaysian Authors Copyright Protection (MACP) to find material for the album. Despite poor sales due to the lack of promotion, the album was well received, and during the 16th Anugerah Industri Muzik, Lentera Timur won multiple awards including Best Pop Ethnic and later on honoured as Album of the Year in AIM 16. She also took home Best Female Vocal trophy for the song 'Di Taman Teman'. She was not present at the award ceremony however as she was away to Mecca to perform Umrah with her family.

Siti also recorded two songs for the soundtrack of the Indonesian film Perempuan Berkalong Sorban. One of the songs was a cover of Opick's "Ketika Cinta", while the other was a new song written by Siti, "Batasku Asaku". Both songs were included in her fourteenth album, Tahajjud Cinta.

In the same year, her wealth is said to have reached RM 50 million by MTV Asia and was named one of the millionaires in entertainment in South East Asia.

=== SATU concert, Tahajjud Cinta and CTKD (2009) ===
On 15 February 2009, her father, Taruddin Ismail, died at 11.50 am at the age of 67, after a heart bypass operation days before does not show any improvement, leaving seven children, and 10 grandchildren behind. She announced a 40-day mourning period for her father and put singing activity on hold, except for Konsert Malam Sinar Maulidur Rasul 1430 Hijrah (1430 Hijrah Special Mawlid Night Concert). Months after the loss, Siti went back to business where she announced her major three days concert at the Istana Budaya, SATU Konsert Eksklusif Dato' Siti Nurhaliza. It began its run on 26 June 2009 in Kuala Lumpur. The tickets were sold out weeks before the debut night. The concert received compliments from critics, and the show was attended by distinguished people such as region well-known artistes like Krisdayanti and Rossa from Indonesia to name some. A month before the concert, she won her ninth consecutive award of Most Popular Malaysian Artist of 2009 and also the Regional Most Popular Artist of 2009 from Anugerah Planet Muzik 2009, beating another 11 contestants where each country, Indonesia, Malaysia, and Singapore has four representatives based on SMS votes.

In March, Siti revealed that she would begin work on her next album later in the year. Apparently, the idea came about while Siti was taking part in an Erma Fatima theatre production, Sirah Junjungan. She also stated that, this will be her first attempt at spiritual songs and she plans to release the album for the holy month Ramadan of 2009 known as Tahajjud Cinta. In September, she became a host to 13 episodes cooking reality series Citarasa Selebriti Bersama Dato' Siti Nurhaliza with several guest artists. Later, Siti and fellow friend, Indonesian singer, Krisdayanti have planned to produce a duet album featuring eight duets where Siti will choose four Malaysian compositions while Krisdayanti will pick the other four from Indonesia. The album was released on 28 December in Malaysia and 27 January in Indonesia, under the name CTKD where it is an abbreviation with double meaning where it stands as the acronyms for the combination of both singers names, CT and KD, and also as the whole title of the album, which is Canda (Joke), Tangis (Cry), Ketawa (Laugh) and Duka (Sad).

In July, her skill as a former ambassador for the Malaysian Red Crescent Society was put to the test when she and a panel doctor of Media Prima performed CPR on director Yasmin Ahmad when she fell unconscious during a presentation in a meeting in TV3's headquarters. In August, Siti was given control of Channel 188 on Astro for 28 hours. Called Channel Siti, it broadcast her concert from June of the same year, SATU Konsert Eksklusif Dato' Siti Nurhaliza, her previous concert which was held at Bukit Jalil, the Siti's Fantasia Tour concert in 2004 and some of her music videos.

=== Bagaikan Sakti concert and SimplySiti (2010–2011) ===
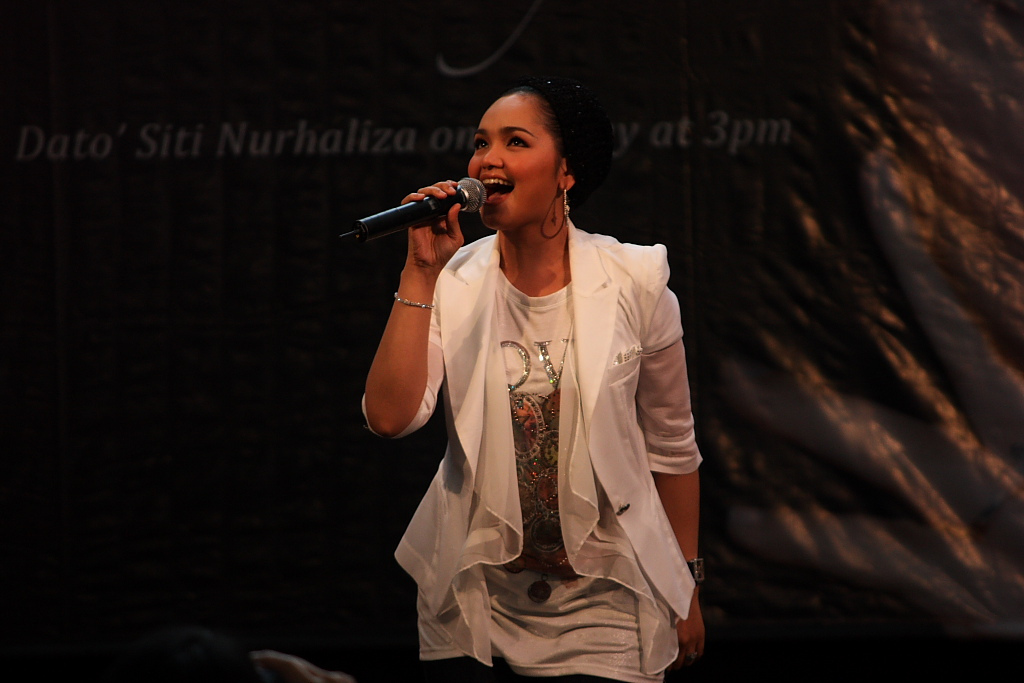
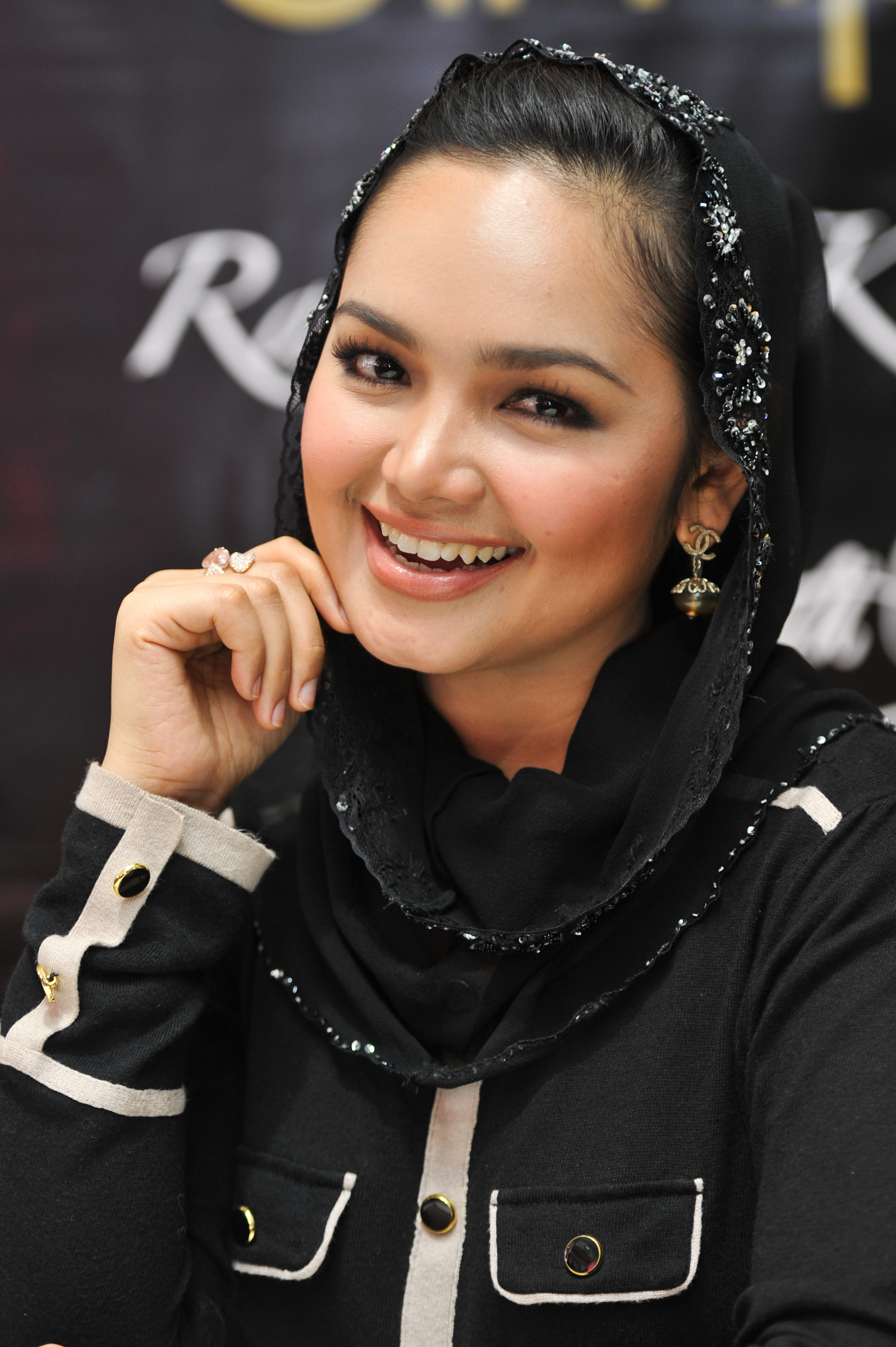
Siti promoting SimplySiti in both Malaysia (left) and Brunei (right) markets in 2010 and 2011.

In 2010, she performed at Konsert Bagaikan Sakti which was held in Esplanade – Theatres on the Bay, Singapore alongside Malaysian producer-composer-songwriter, M. Nasir which also was broadcast live through Astro Box Office Events (Channel 955) on 1 January, and the repeat show from 2 to 10 January. Her own company, Siti Nurhaliza Productions (M) Sdn. Bhd. has also produced a concert for two Malaysian award-winning artists, Faizal Tahir and Aizat Amdan entitled Konsert Satu Suara which was accompanied by Simfoni Orkestra Kebangsaan (National Orchestra Symphony) on 12 February until 14th at Istana Budaya. On 25 March, she received her first award of the year, Anugerah Artis Contoh HIP TV 2009 (HIP TV Role Model Artist Award 2009) defeating four other candidates based on votes from viewers through short message service (SMS). On 30 March, she launched her own beauty and cosmetic products under the name SimplySiti. The products underwent research and development in Korea, and are incorporated with Nanotechnology before receiving approval of Halal status by JAKIM.

Less than two months after being commercialised since late March, her skincare products range, SimplySiti received "The Best Halal Product" under Cosmetic category by Halal Journal Magazine. and on 11 January 2011, she received two awards from The BrandLaureate – Small and Medium Enterprises Chapter Awards (The BrandLaureate – SME's Chapter Awards), one for her SimplySiti range, for Most Promising Brand and another one for herself, first time introduced in 2011, The BrandLaureate Tun Dr. Siti Hasmah SME's Women of The Year 2010 which was presented by Siti Hasmah Mohamad Ali, wife of Malaysia's fourth Prime Minister Mahathir Mohamad herself. She received the Inspiration Woman Award from Association of Malaysian and Indonesian Journalists (ISWAMI) on 29 January.

=== SITI, All Your Love and History Channel (2011–2012) ===
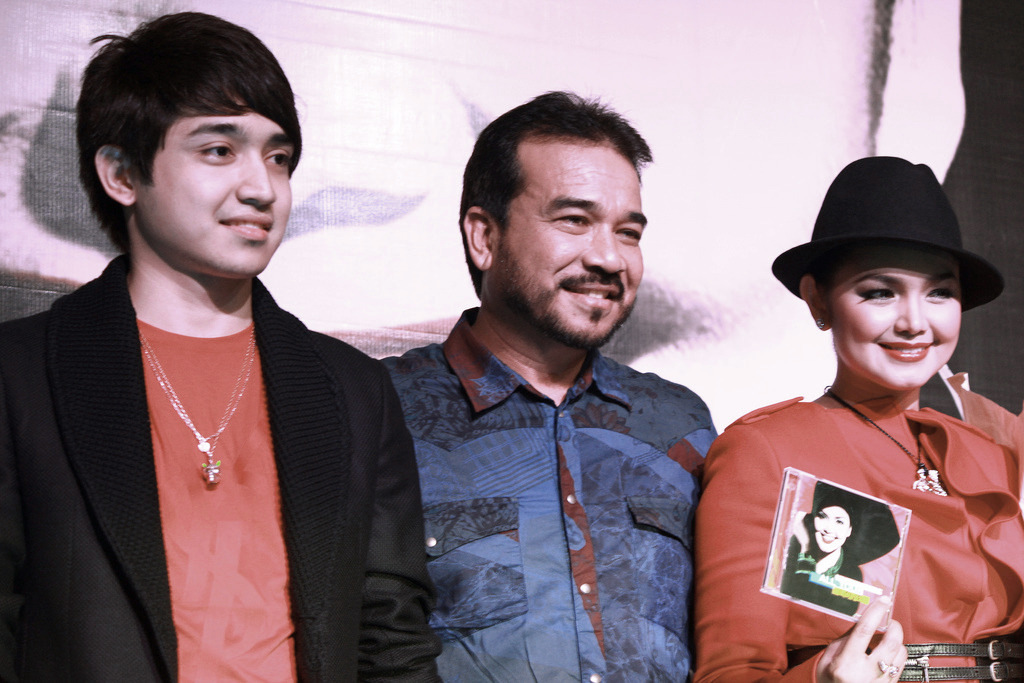
Siti Nurhaliza with her husband, Datuk Seri Khalid and her stepson, Adib Khalid at the launching of All Your Love.

In early 2011, she hosted her own talk show programme, SITI, which with 13 episodes, encompassing four main segments – V.I.P. Siti, Sentuhan Kasih (Caring Touch), Siti's Perspective and Siti's Symphony with the first episode aired on 12 February.

In early March 2011, she announced that she is working on her first full English album, entitled All Your Love which was produced by her own stepson's production team What's Up Entertainment, with all the songs written and produced by Australian singers, Christian Alexanda and Bryan Bouro and released on 26 September with her first English single, Falling in Love debuted at a concert in UiTM where she also expressed her interest to further her study in that university. Two out of ten tracks from the album, Remember You and I Wait Forever were a duet between her and Sean Kingston and Christian Alexanda respectively.

On 16 July, she won her tenth Regional Most Popular Artiste in a row beating fellow artistes from Malaysia, Indonesia and Singapore, thus setting a new record in the Anugerah Planet Muzik. This would be her last appearance in the category, as the organiser decided to drop her name from participating in the same category in the future. In September 2011, her company, Siti Nurhaliza Production (SNP) produced her first ever reality singing competition, I-Klon which was aired in November 2011. The aim of this show is to search for talents that not only can sing but also imitate their idol. On 17 October, she was reported to be working on her life documentary which was aired on History Channel on 11 January 2012 to coincide with her 33rd birthday.

In April 2012, she accepted an offer to be featured in Sami Yusuf's latest album, Salaam for his song, You Came To Me which was recorded in three languages, Arabic, Malay and English. She also performed the song alongside him for his debut concert in Singapore, 'Konsert Salaam Sami Yusuf' on 8 July. A day later, on 9 July, she was given the chance to perform as the opening act and also the closing ceremonies of the 15th Malaysia Games or SUKMA XV on 16 July. Few days earlier, on 5 July, she received another award by EH! magazine for the award of Celebrity with Best Achievements for a second time since 2010.

In September, she announced a new album project with an Indonesian recording company, Virgo Records for Indonesian market where so far a number of Indonesian composers and lyricist have given their songs to Siti, including former lead vocal of Kerispatih, Samuel Simorangkir and Dewiq. The same album will also include a song written by herself and composed by a Malaysian composer, Aubrey Suwito. In the same month also, she received the Entertainment Icon award by Anugerah Radio24 Bernama. Two weeks earlier, on 11 November, she performed a 2-hour concert at Grand Ballroom, Bukit Gambang Resort City in Gambang, Pahang where it was attended by more than 5,000 people including her fans from Indonesia and Singapore and the Sultan of Pahang, Sultan Haji Ahmad Shah. During the concert, she performed her latest single, Galau which was composed by an Indonesian composer, which will be featured in her latest project with Universal Music. After the concert, she announced that she will be start touring Indonesia from 8 December until 14 December in several major cities, including Jakarta, Pekanbaru and Banjarbaru. However, on 13 December, she has to call off her last destination tour for her husband was involved in a motorcycle accident in New Zealand.

=== New image, Siti Nurhaliza in Symphony and Lentera Timur concert (2013) ===
On her 34th birthday, Siti announced she had decided to wear hijab full-time, including during performances. She also commented that she would be taking a short break until April to take care of her husband, who was involved in an accident in December 2012. In the same month, her company, Siti Nurhaliza Productions (SNP) was reported to be working on the second season of I-Klon, a reality singing competition which had debuted in 2011. In early February, Siti debuted her own 13-episode game show, Siti Ooo...Som, which she co-hosted with Nabil Ahmad and Sharifah Shahira. That month, she was revealed to be short listed for the fifth Shorty Awards in the category of Best Reality Star in Social Media.

On 2 March, she won the Bella On-Stage Award, beating other nine contenders for the inaugural award for Malaysian women that have made tremendous achievement in the performing arts. On the same day, her cosmetic company, SimplySiti was recognized by the Malaysia Book of Records for Biggest Participation in Skin Transformation event in One Day. On 7 March, she was chosen to perform in collaboration concert between Malaysia and Indonesia, Konsert Nusantara at Istana Budaya alongside Hafiz Suip, Rossa and few other Malaysian and Indonesian singers. On 21 March, she performed a duet with Kenny Babyface, singing the songs "Fire" and "When I Fall in Love" for Sapurakencana Petroleum Malaysia Grand Prix Charity Gala 2013. The charity event raised more than RM 200,000 for heart patients.

In June, she received a special humanity award from Majlis Perundangan Pertubuhan Islam Malaysia (Mapim), for her effort and support of Mapim's Gaza fundraising. On 5 to 7 July, she performed at Siti Nurhaliza in Symphony – with the Malaysian Philharmonic Orchestra at Petronas Philharmonic Hall for three nights in a row in which tickets were sold out weeks before the said event. This was her first solo concert at the Petronas Philharmonic Hall where 12 years earlier she was only a guest performer at Tan Sri SM Salim's concert with the Malaysian Philharmonic Orchestra.

In August, she received Anugerah Artis Wanita Pilihan (Favourite Female Artist Award) from the inaugural Anugerah Melodi 2013 during a special Eid episode of Melodi where the winners were chosen entirely by the viewers. That same month, she was chosen as one of the 'Inspirers' for Akademi Fantasia 2013 students alongside Melly Goeslaw and Faizal Tahir where they will share their experiences as singers and motivate the students in their paths as new artists. In August, she was chosen among few select Malaysian artists to participate in Konsert 'Harmony and Unity' on 25 August which was held at Dataran Merdeka, alongside few Indonesian artists, including Ahmad Dhani and Rossa which was aired on both countries television stations, TV1 and Indosiar respectively. In September, she was interviewed by National Geographic Channel for a special documentary in conjunction with the 50th Malaysia Day, 'Malaysia: Through The Decades' which was aired on 16 September, alongside Yuna, Lat and Malaysia's first astronaut, Sheikh Muszaphar Shukor for their insights on Malaysia and what it has achieved over the past 50 years. She nominated in Anugerah Planet Muzik 2013 at Suntec Convention Hall, Singapore in three different categories – Best Malaysia Song, Best Duo/Group and Regional Most Popular Song which are all shared with Hafiz Suip for their collaboration in both artists' single, Muara Hati. The two won two of the three nominations (Best Duo/Group and Regional Most Popular Song). Also in September, she held her second major concert in 2013 titled Konsert Lentera Timur at Istana Budaya, which was her first traditional concert in 18 years of her career. Backed by 40 musicians from Orkestra Tradisional Malaysia, with 35 different traditional songs, ranging from Zapin, Samrah, Keroncong, Joget to few other traditional genres, the 2-hour concert was tentatively planned to be only for three days in a row from 20 to 22 September, before the fourth day, which is 24 September was added after receiving high demands from her fans and fans of traditional music to add another date to the 3-day concert. On 27 October, the concert was revealed as the most successful solo concert ever held at Istana Budaya, where it managed to collect more than RM 900,000.

In late November and December 2013, she was invited to perform for two international events. On 28 November, she was in Japan after receiving an invitation by the Japanese embassy in Malaysia for Asean-Japan Music Festival – Music for Healing after the Earthquake in commemoration of the 40th anniversary of Japan – Asean countries relationship, and as a musical appeal for relief aids for victims of 2011 Tōhoku earthquake and tsunami. During the festival, she performed a medley of songs that she personally had chosen – "Biarlah Rahsia", "Koibito yo" (a Japanese song, made famous by Mayumi Itsuwa) and "Nirmala" – in front of representatives from both Japan (including Japanese Prime Minister, Shinzō Abe) and Asean countries. The festival was made available for viewing for worldwide audiences through NHK World. On 5 December, she was invited to perform at the 2013 Asian Television Awards at Resorts World Sentosa, Singapore, where she performed "Lebih Indah" and "On the Floor". The show was broadcast for the first time to both STAR World and Channel V reaching audiences in Hong Kong, Indonesia, Malaysia, Philippines, Singapore, Taiwan, Thailand and Vietnam.

=== Where the Heart Is and Live in Singapore concerts, Icon of Malaysia and Fragmen (2014) ===
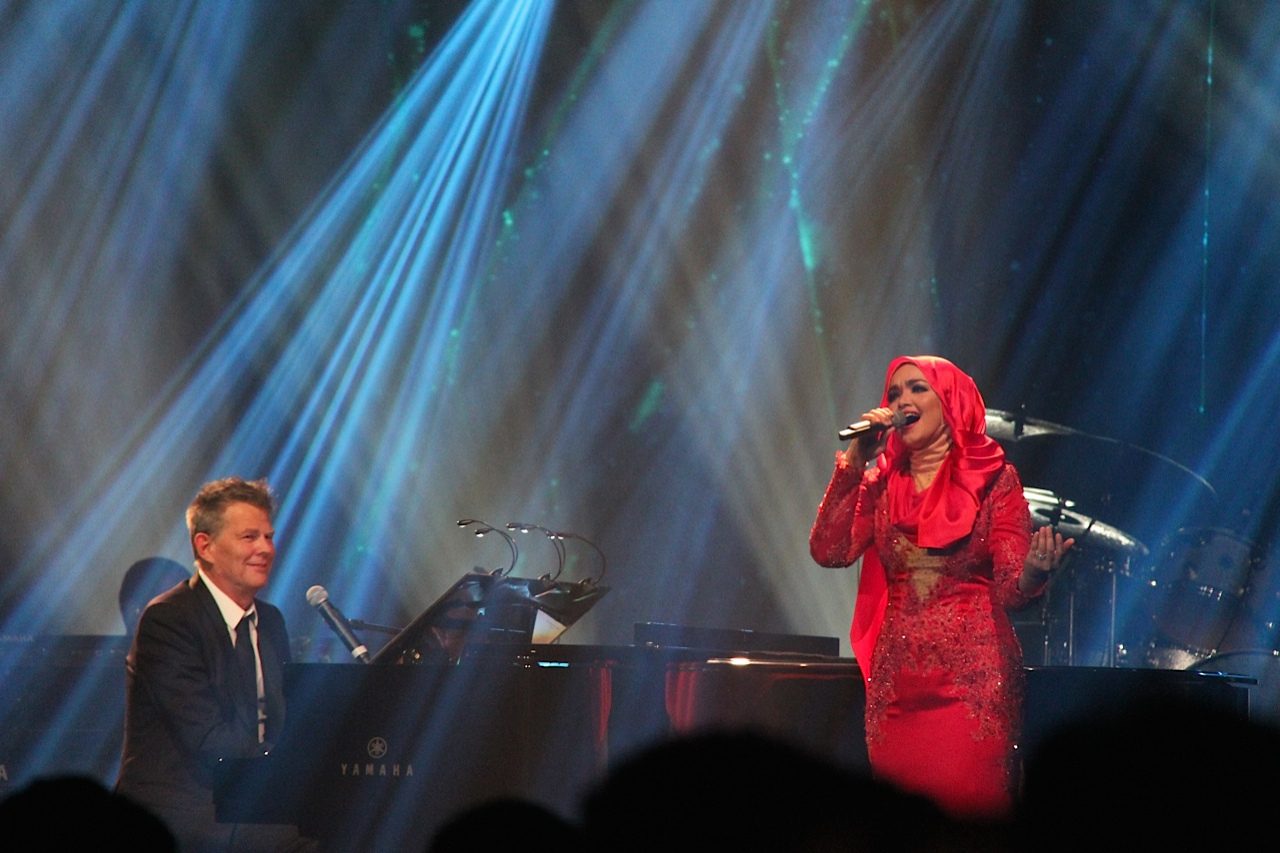
Siti Nurhaliza performing "I Will Always Love You" with David Foster during his "David Foster and Friends" concert, in conjunction with "Sapurakencana Petroleum Malaysia Grand Prix Gala Dinner & Concert 2014" on 27 March.

On 6 January 2014, she announced the dates for her first charity concert, where proceeds would be channelled to her own charity organisation, Yayasan Nurjiwa (Nurjiwa Foundation). Named "Dato Siti Nurhaliza Live in Concert – Where the Heart is", the two-hour concert was held on two consecutive nights, 8 and 9 February at Plenary Hall, Kuala Lumpur Convention Centre. On 9 February, it was revealed that the two-day concert reached its goal, grossing more than RM 1 million from ticket sales and donations.

In February, she was announced as one of the guest artists in a one-night only "David Foster and Friends" show that was originally scheduled as the major event of Sapurakencana Petroleum Malaysia Grand Prix Gala Dinner & Concert 2014 on 27 March. However, due to the date's proximity to the Malaysia Airlines Flight 370 incident, the entire show was later revamped to become a full-fledged tribute concert. During the night of the show, she was accompanied by Foster on piano to perform two songs that Foster originally produced – I Will Always Love You and Because You Loved Me. Foster also accompanied Siti to Siti's own single, Seindah Biasa.

Siti held a concert in Singapore on 12 April at The Star Theater, the first since her last solo concert in Singapore in 2008. The one-day concert, billed as "Dato' Siti Nurhaliza – Live in Singapore" received positive reviews from local concert reviewers. One of the reviewers praised her ability to sound "flawless" while both singing and dancing at the same time. In April, she was honoured by the Malaysia Book of Records as one of the recipients of "Icon of Malaysia". The same award was also conferred to other Malaysians who have achieved success in their respective fields – Dato' Jimmy Choo, Datuk Dr. Sheikh Muszaphar Shukor and Tan Sri Tony Fernandes.

On 30 June, she released her sixteenth solo album, Fragmen which was certified as Platinum, after more than 10,000 copies were shipped in less than two months. Two months later, on 17 October, Siti won two awards from 2014 Anugerah Planet Muzik in the category of Best Female Artiste and Best Song (Malaysia) for "Lebih Indah". On 21 October, the Indonesian version of Fragmen was officially launched and released at Artotel, Central Jakarta with an additional track, a duet with Cakra Khan, "Seluruh Cinta". She also embarked on a 5-day promotional trip to Indonesia, where she participated in various Indonesian entertainment programs including on MNCTV, RCTI, Global TV, NET. and SCTV.

In November she won three different awards — "National Icon" from Inaugural Malaysia Women of Excellence Awards 2014 on 10 November, "Jewel of Muslim World" award from the Jewels of Muslim World Awards 2014 on 11 November and "Asian Music Legend" award from 2014 Top Asia Corporate Ball on 22 November. On 6 December, she won three awards out of eight nominations that she received from 2014 Anugerah Industri Muzik in the category of Best Album Recording for the album Konsert Lentera Timur (Dato' Siti Nurhaliza Bersama Orkestra Tradisional Malaysia), Best Vocal Performance in a Song (Female) for "Lebih Indah" and Best Album for Fragmen. Her winning for "Lebih Indah" marked the twelfth time she wins the category since she joined the Malaysian music industry.

On 18 December, she is one of the recipients of Anugerah Srikandi Negara from Peninsular Malay Students Federation (GPMS). Less than a week later, on 24 December, she was announced as the winner for three awards from 2014 World Music Awards – World's Best Female Malay Artist, World's Best Malay Live Act and World's Best Malay Entertainer.

=== Unplugged and Satu Suara, Vol. 2 concerts (2015) ===
Closing performance by Siti for Anugerah MeleTOP ERA 2015 on 22 February 2015.

On New Year's Eve 2014, Siti was in Singapore as a guest artist for the countdown of Celebrate SG50, which marked Singapore's 50 years of independence. 2015 marked her twentieth year in the Malaysian entertainment industry since she won 1995 RTM Bintang HMI singing competition. To celebrate the anniversary, a special one night only acoustic concert was planned and organized on 7 April 2015 at Istana Budaya. Titled Dato' Siti Nurhaliza Unplugged 2015, tickets for the concert sold out days before the concert date and her vocal performances and overall concert received positive reviews from critics. Present in the concert were people who have helped her throughout the years including her former mentor, Adnan Abu Hassan and former Prime Minister Mahathir Mohamad. Two months later, the concert was released in multiple formats including CD and DVD with three additional tracks accompanying the CD release of the Unplugged album. In conjunction with her twentieth year in the industry, a special tribute song was gifted to her by Era FM and Raku (a radio station subsidiary of Astro). Titled "Inspirasi" (Inspiration), it was composed by Faizal Tahir and sung by him and Hafiz Suip.

A news report by MeleTOP on 11 November that covers both Konsert Satu Suara, Vol. 2 and her pregnancy rumours.

In August, she recorded and performed "Nenjae Ezhu", a song composed by A. R. Rahman – her first Tamil song for the opening performance of International Superstar 2015, an international Indian singing competition. In October, Siti was inducted in the 2016 edition of The 500 Most Influential Muslims. In the same month in Singapore, she shared an award with Cakra Khan from Indonesia in the category of Best Collaboration (Artiste) for their duet, "Seluruh Cinta" from the 2015 installment of Anugerah Planet Muzik. In the following month, she embarked on her second concert at Istana Budaya in 2015 on 7 and 8 November with Konsert Satu Suara, Vol. 2. Accompanied by Hetty Koes Endang (Indonesia) and Ramli Sarip (Singapore), the two-day concert was a commercial success, managing to raise more than RM 650,000 from tickets sales alone.

During the two-day concert, rumours of her pregnancy arose. While initially refusing to confirm or deny the rumours, she revealed on her personal Instagram account on 1 December that she experienced a miscarriage after two months of pregnancy. She wrote, "I don't want to deny the news of my pregnancy as this was a beautiful gift that I have been waiting for a long time...This gift was too new and fragile, I was just waiting for the right time." On the same day, she was announced as one of the top Asian artists in Malaysia on Spotify's annual Year in Music list. That same month, she was invited to Indonesia as a guest judge for the Top 8 of Dangdut Academy Asia (D'Academy Asia), a Nusantara-wide dangdut singing competition featuring contestants from Indonesia, Malaysia, Singapore and Brunei.

=== Return after miscarriage, Dato' Siti Nurhaliza & Friends and new singles (2016) ===
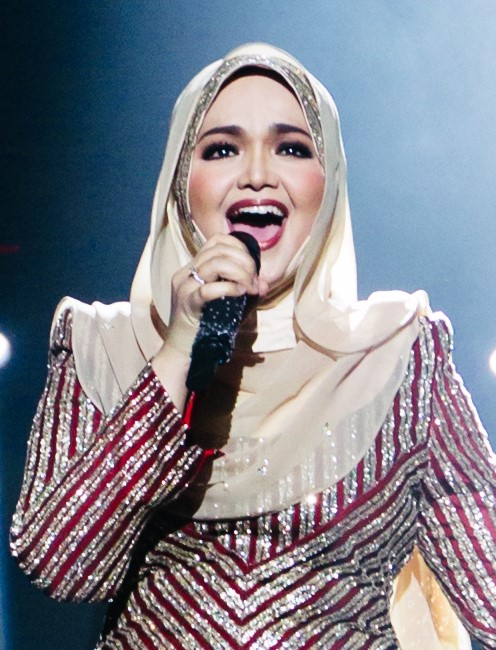
Siti Nurhaliza performing 'Memories' along with Whitney Houston through virtual duet in Dato' Siti Nurhaliza & Friends in 2016

2016 was a busy year for Siti as she was involved with a new business line, major concert, and multiple releases of new music. In January 2016, she returned to Indonesia as she celebrated her 37th birthday on the same day as she performed for Indonesian television station Indosiar's 21st anniversary, Konser Raya 21 Indosiar Untuk Indonesia. In March, after the success of Simplysiti, her own cosmetics and skincare line, she debuted the release of her own ready-to-wear fashion line for women, Creación by Siti Nurhaliza. In collaboration with Malaysian hijab brand Ariani and Malaysian textile company Jakel, she was involved heavily with the concept and design of the fashion line. On 2 April, she staged a one-night only Dato' Siti Nurhaliza & Friends Concert at Stadium Negara. Sponsored by Yonder Music and Celcom, the highly successful concert was attended by more than 7,000 people. Exclusive for the concert, she also debuted her digital duet "Memories" with American artist Whitney Houston. Throughout the entire two-hour concert, she sang over 20 songs and she was accompanied by both Malaysian and Indonesian guest artists including Anggun, Afgansyah Reza, Jaclyn Victor, and Faizal Tahir. Overall, Dato Siti Nurhaliza & Friends Concert received positive reviews and feedback from critics and concert reviewers.

On 20 June, she released "Hari Kemenangan", a special single for Eid al-Fitr, after her last in 2006. On 12 August, "Dirgahayu" her duet with one of the famous male singer in Malaysia, Faizal Tahir was released. The song serves as the theme song for Lara Aishah, a 100-episode Malaysian adaptation of Mexican telenovela, La Loba. On 4 November, the song was included as one of the bonus tracks of Faizal Tahir's fourth solo album, Anatomi. Its music video premiered as the backdrop during their live performance of the song at the 22nd Anugerah Muzik Industri Muzik. During the 22nd Anugerah Industri Muzik on 18 December, she was the most nominated artist of the event with seven nominations in six categories. She was 22nd Anugerah Industri Muzik's biggest winner and her live album Unplugged and its singles enabled her to win several major categories including her first Best Nasyid Song with "Mikraj Cinta" and the fan-voted Choice Malaysia Singer. A single that was recorded as a tribute to her late father, "Menatap dalam Mimpi" won Best Musical Arrangement in a Song and her thirteenth Best Vocal Performance in a Song (Female). She also won her seventh Best Album with Unplugged.

After receiving more than 300 songs submissions for her to shortlist and include in her new album since November 2016, SimetriSiti, her seventeenth solo album was released on 10 May 2017. Citing an estimate cost of RM100,000 to produce, the 10-track album featured collaborations with Malaysia rapper Joe Flizzow and Indonesian singer Judika.

=== "Anta Permana", Asian tour and ManifestaSITI2020 (2017–2020) ===
On 14 October, "Dirgahayu" was awarded Best Duo/Group from 2017 Anugerah Planet Muzik in Singapore. On 24 October, she was conferred by Sultan Ahmad Shah of Pahang the "Darjah Kebesaran Sri Sultan Ahmad Shah Pahang" (SSAP) and would be addressed with the honorific title of "Dato' Sri" henceforth. In November 2017, she was included in The 500 Most Influential Muslims for the third year in a row. In December, she was named Most Streamed Local Artiste in Malaysia by Spotify.

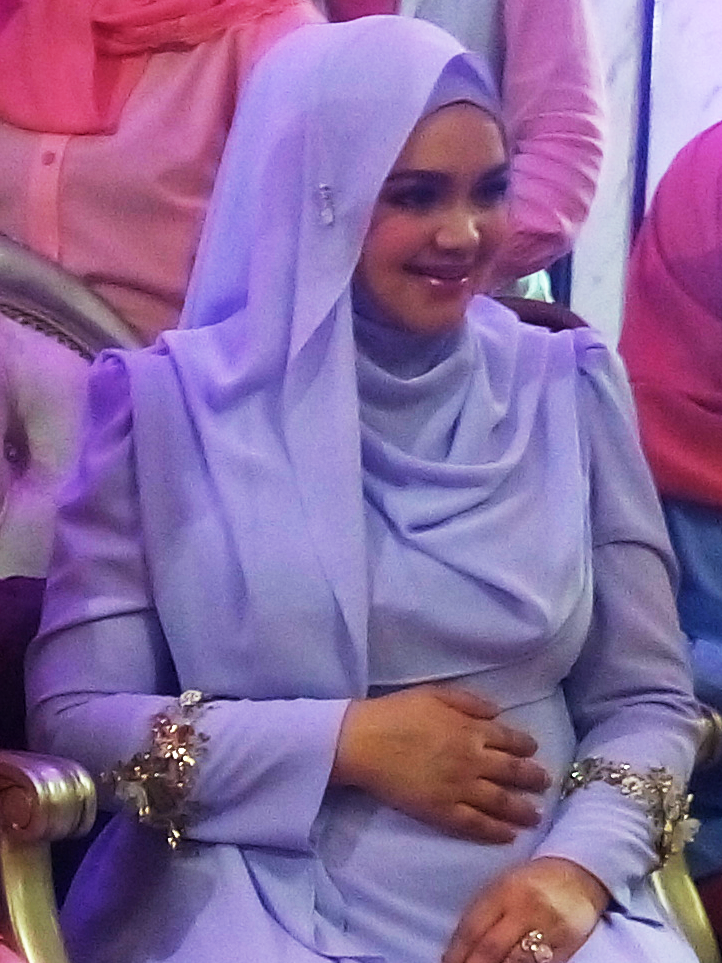
Pregnant Siti during the 14th anniversary of her fan club on 21 January 2018.

In 2018, Siti returned to the music industry after a brief hiatus to focus on her pregnancy. On 5 March 2018, in anticipation of the birth of her first child, she released the single, "Comel Pipi Merah". On 10 March, Malaysian animation concert Hora Horey Didi & Friends was released. It featured Siti playing new character "Mak Iti" who also sung "Oh Nana", a new song recorded by Siti for the animation. After few months of professional break, she released a new duet single with Malaysian singer Khai Bahar in June 2018. A rerecorded version of "Comel Pipi Merah", "Cinta Syurga" is a slow song with added elements of Islamic zikir. Both versions of the songs were commercially successful. "Comel Pipi Merah" and "Cinta Syurga" were later certified four times platinum and gold respectively.

In late July, she revealed that she was chosen alongside Faizal Tahir as regular judges for the inaugural season of Big Stage, a singing competition for rising new Malaysian singers. Few days earlier, she was reported to be working on a new single that was written by Malaysian singer Hael Husaini for September 2018 release. On 21 September, she released "Anta Permana". A single with both modern and classical elements, "Anta Permana" was well-received and was certified 11 times platinum in less than a year of its release. On 28 September, her duet with Indonesian singer Judika "Kisah Ku Inginkan" from SimetriSiti won Best Collaboration (Artiste) from the 2018 Anugerah Planet Muzik in Singapore. She returned to Japan on 4 October to represent Malaysia at the second ASEAN-Japan Music Festival. This was also her second appearance for the music festival after representing Malaysia for the same event in 2013. She was listed in The 500 Most Influential Muslims for the fourth year running in the same month. In early December, she was named Most Streamed Local Artistes in Malaysia by Spofity for second year in a row.

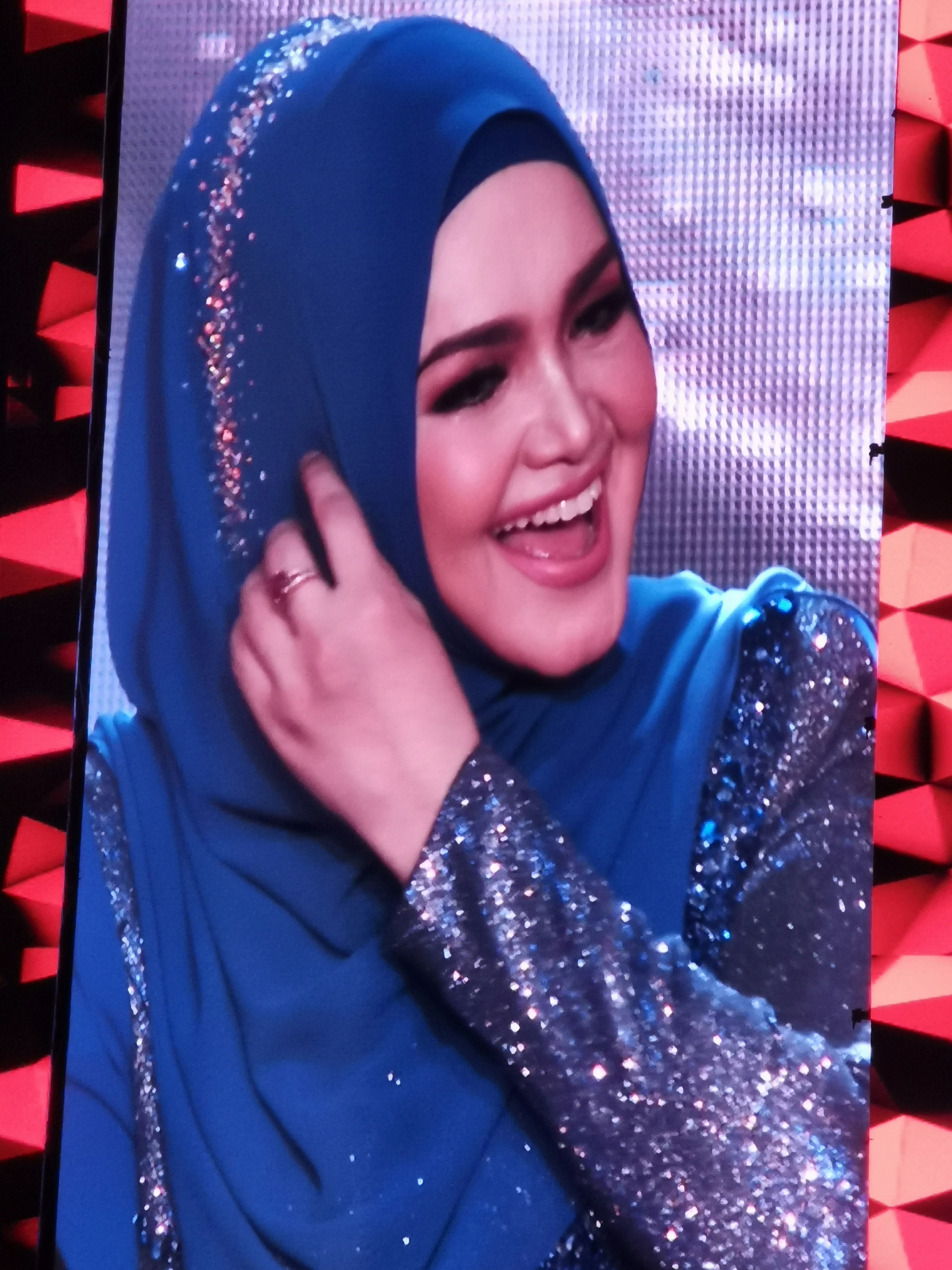
Siti during her Dato' Sri Siti Nurhaliza On Tour at Axiata Arena on 16 March 2019.

First announced in December 2018, Siti embarked on Dato' Sri Siti Nurhaliza On Tour to Indonesia on 21 February, Singapore on 2 March, and Malaysia on 16 March. Citing production cost of RM10 million, it is the most expensive concert by a Malaysian artist. Her last stop for the tour in Malaysia at Axiata Arena on 16 March was attended by 12,000 people. "Ikhlas", a special Eid al-Fitr single featuring Siti with Indonesian singer Nissa Sabyan and Singaporean singer Taufik Batisah was released on 31 May. A special collaboration between Apple Music and Universal Music Malaysia, it is the first of its kind where singers from three countries sing together an Eid al-Fitr song. On 10 July 2019, "Kasihku Selamanya", theme song to the romantic-horror film Dendam Pontianak was released. It only took Siti two hours to complete the recording of her vocals for the song. After almost 10 years in the Malaysian market, she returned to Indonesia to launch and promote Simplysiti on 8 August. In the same month, she reprised her role as a regular judge for the second season of Big Stage. In collaboration with Shopee Malaysia, she performed for Shopee X Simplysiti mini concert at Kuala Lumpur Convention Centre on 14 September where more than 1,000 fans were in attendance. During the mini concert, she also launched her first health drink Beausiti.

Siti Nurhaliza's 18th studio album, ManifestaSITI2020 was released on 3 July 2020. Originally planned to be released in April 2020, the album launching was postponed due to the COVID-19 pandemic and nationwide quarantine to combatting the deadly coronavirus. ManifestaSITI2020 contains 11 tracks wherein 6 of them was released as singles earlier. The Malaysian music industry was revitalized when famed Malaysian music figure Dato Sri Siti Nurhaliza released her latest album titled ManifestaSITI2020 on 3 July amidst the Recovery Movement Control Order (RMCO). Her album received positive feedback from local music listeners and received a warm response for both digital platforms and physical album sales. The legendary singer also successfully held an online interactive concert 'Manifestival Siti Nurhaliza x HotKool' on 21 July 2020. Thanks to inspiration from previous concerts that were held in Korea and Thailand, the interactive 360-degree concert via Zoom is the first of its kind in Malaysia which also made Dato Siti Nurhaliza the first artist to be involved in a large-scale online concert.

=== Continued success (2020–present) ===
On 7 December 2020, she was listed as the Forbes Asia's 100 Digital Stars Most Influential Asian Pacific Celebrities for her advocacy work during the COVID-19 pandemic alongside Blackpink, BTS, and Shah Rukh Khan. On 22 December, Adelaide Festival Centre announced that Siti would be one of the few international stars to be part of the Adelaide Festival Centre's Walk of Fame. The singer was selected among the eleven performers who performed at the centre last year after gaining the most online votes. This makes Siti the first Malaysian and Southeast Asian person to have her name chosen for immortalization at Adelaide's Festival Center Walk of Fame.

On 1 April 2021, Siti released an album that features children's songs, in honor of her second child. The album features seven tracks with two additional lullabies, six of them are traditional children's songs which have been re-arranged and have slightly different lyrics. Siti recorded the album over three days in early March 2021, with her pregnancy entering its 8th month. On 13 November 2024 Siti Nurhaliza was proclaimed as 3rd Biduanita Negara after the late Puan Sri Saloma (1978) & Datuk Sharifah Aini (2006). "Biduanita Negara" translates to "National Songstress" and is a prestigious title in Malaysia, recognizing individuals who have made significant contributions to the country's music and arts.

In March 2025, once again Siti made Malaysian proud when it has been revealed 'Anta Permana' a song released by her in 2018 to be among King Charles III's favourite tunes, earning a spot on his personally curated playlist featuring 17 songs from around the Commonwealth. "Anta Permana", a single compose by Hael Husaini & Ezra Kong, was featured on The King's Music Room on Apple Music 1.

== Artistry ==
=== Voice ===
Siti is musically classified as a coloratura mezzo-soprano. She has won "Best Vocal Performance in an Album/Single" from Anugerah Industri Muzik, Malaysia's equivalent of Grammy Awards, 13 times.

Adjie Esa Poetra, an Indonesian vocal instructor, described Siti as "very careful," noting she "never fails in the tone production and she's able to produce the most artistic and beautiful tone as possible.... In any songs, she can sing it with ease but powerful other than possessing more than four-octave vocal range."

"Kurniaan Dalam Samaran" (1999)
One of her songs that is rarely performed live and also one of the songs that is said to be the most technical in Pancawarna album

M. Nasir, music critic and music composer has praised Siti's voice as saying, "When we talk about her, she is the voice...Give her any songs, she can deliver it very well and it is not a problem to find a suitable song for her." He further praised Siti for her experiments with melisma.

One of her trickiest songs to perform is Kurniaan Dalam Samaran, a Japanese enka-influenced song where it requires her play of transition of alto to soprano vocal tones and she rarely performed it live. However, at her 2009 SATU concert, she performed it live, where it received appraisals from critics and fans where one of the reviewers cited her live rendition as, "The Japanese-flavoured song required her to switch from her natural voice to falsetto in a hair-raising cadenza somewhere in the absurdly high range most women vocalists would cringe from. But she pulled it off effortlessly, sending shivers down my spine."

Gareth Gates who has performed together with Siti during MTV Asia Awards 2004 when he was asked what does he think about Siti, he said, "She definitely has the looks and she certainly has the voice. If she continues to sing the way she does, she'll go really far."

Lea Salonga, Filipino singer and actress who has done various theatrical work, including Miss Saigon and several Disney's movies has also expressed her praise and respect towards Siti's vocal ability during her concert in Malaysia in 2010 where she sang one of the songs made famous by Siti and 2 By 2, Tiga Malam during the closing ceremony of her concert. In 2011, another Filipino artist, Gary Valenciano during his visit in Malaysia has expressed her admiration of Siti's vocal ability. He commented, "Based on what I've been told by the local media, I believe the best Malay song and the best vocal I've ever heard has to be Siti Nurhaliza's. If it was possible for me to meet her, I would definitely want to do a duet with her. If [I] were given a chance, I definitely want to compose a song for her, that is if she wishes."

Sami Yusuf who requested for her to be featured in his album, Salaam has commented, "Siti is not only has a good voice, but also has an interesting personality. She is a real woman that Malaysia and ASEAN should be proud of."

In 2013, an American singer, Kenny Babyface who did a duet with her during Sapurakencana Petroleum Malaysia Grand Prix Charity Gala 2013 has also repeatedly expressed his admiration towards Siti. He praised Siti for her "beautiful voice" and her great singing skills.

=== Influences ===
Growing up as a child, Siti mainly performed traditional and classic Malay folk songs. She has said one of her greatest influences were Sudirman Arshad and P. Ramlee, and, her international idols were Barbra Streisand, Celine Dion, Mariah Carey and Whitney Houston. In 2008, during Céline Dion's Taking Chances Tour in Malaysia, Siti was given an opportunity to meet her idol, and gave Céline a signed copy of one of her solo albums, Hadiah Daripada Hati.

=== Musical styles and themes ===
As a lyricist and record producer, most of her singles' lyrics revolve around the theme of love, although she has penned numbers of thematic single of spirituality and female empowerment. Several of her singles were written by her were targeted to a specific party – "Biarlah Rahsia" (Let It Be A Secret) was written with the allusion to the media who constantly investigate her private personal relationships and "Cahaya Cinta" (Light of Love) was written specially for her husband during her marriage in 2006.

She has recorded five ethnic pop oriented albums – four solo studio albums and one duet studio album with Noraniza Idris. She has been taught on how to sing traditional songs by her own mother who herself is a folk singer. She has been promoting this genre of music on almost each and every major concert of her like when she did at her concert at the Royal Albert Hall, medleys of Malay folk songs and traditional music songs.

== Public image ==
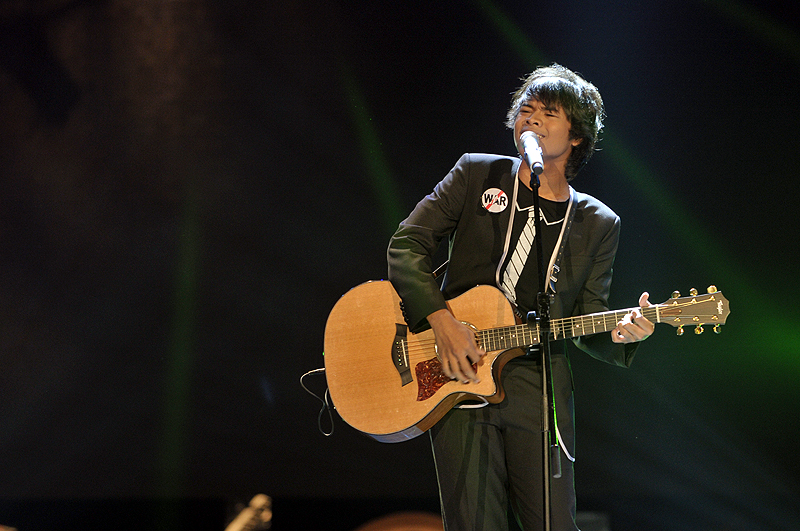
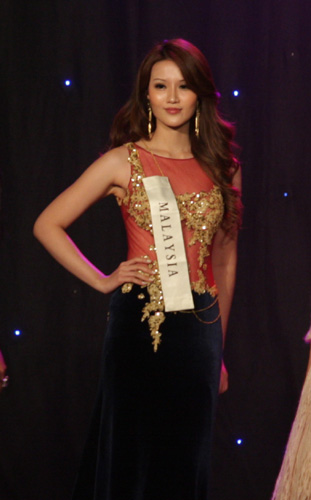
Aizat Amdan (left) and Soo Wincci (right) are said to be influenced by Siti.

When she made her debut into the industry, she was often labelled as a penyanyi kampung (old-fashioned or conservative singer) for her modest attire and her refusal to take pictures with a man for a magazine cover, unless at a ceremony or at an award-accepting event. During her early years as a singer, she was criticised for refusing to wear daring clothes and her principle of not taking pictures with male artists. She was quoted as saying: "As an artist, I do realize that there are many social responsibilities that I need to take care of. So, I opt to be moderate in everything, including in my sartorial matter." and "I want to show what my talent is, and my God-gifted vocal ability without relying [on the image] of being sexy.". Her debut in Indonesia in 1997 with modest, beautiful and talented personality has said to revolutionise Indonesian music industry which famous with Dangdut which before this promoted sensual and erotic elements through the performances, especially those by female artistes. Her modest image was the subject of appraisals and positive feedback even from the Islamic scholars from Malaysia and Indonesia. Since then, her popularity throughout the South East Asia music industry has remained strong, proven as she was voted as Most Popular Female Artiste ten times in a row and Regional Most Popular Artiste in 2011 in Anugerah Planet Muzik 2011, beating contenders from Malaysia, Singapore and Indonesia.

Her eastern image was also being cited as a good example for other artists to follow. In 2008, former State Minister for Youth and Sport Affairs of Indonesia, Adhyaksa Dault has advised Dewi Persik who is known for her open and sexy dancing movements to tone down her performances and follow the steps that Siti Nurhaliza has taken when venturing into the entertainment industry – "She's not over the top, she doesn't wear revealing clothes and doesn't dance sexily, but she's still able to be locally and internationally recognized". She has been cited as an idol and as an inspiration by many Malaysian and non-Malaysian artists like Malaysia's Aizat Amdan, Misha Omar, Nicholas Teo, Soo Wincci, Singaporean Idol finalist, Maia Lee, Indonesian pop group vocalist, Sunu, from Matta, Judika and many others.

In 2007, her image likeness was used as part of the promotion by Malaysian Ministry of Tourism, Malaysia Windows Live Agent – Siti to attract more visitors from Japan. The cartoon is used in the Windows Live Messenger (formerly known as MSN Messenger) where it will provide information on attractive tourist destinations in Malaysia. In January 2011, Siti was proposed as the cultural ambassador for Malay community by the Association of Malaysian and Indonesian Journalists (ISWAMI), based on both countries' communities acceptance of Siti's personality. ISWAMI chief believed that Siti may help ease strained relations should there be a crisis between Malaysia and Indonesia.

== Other activities ==
=== Philanthropy ===
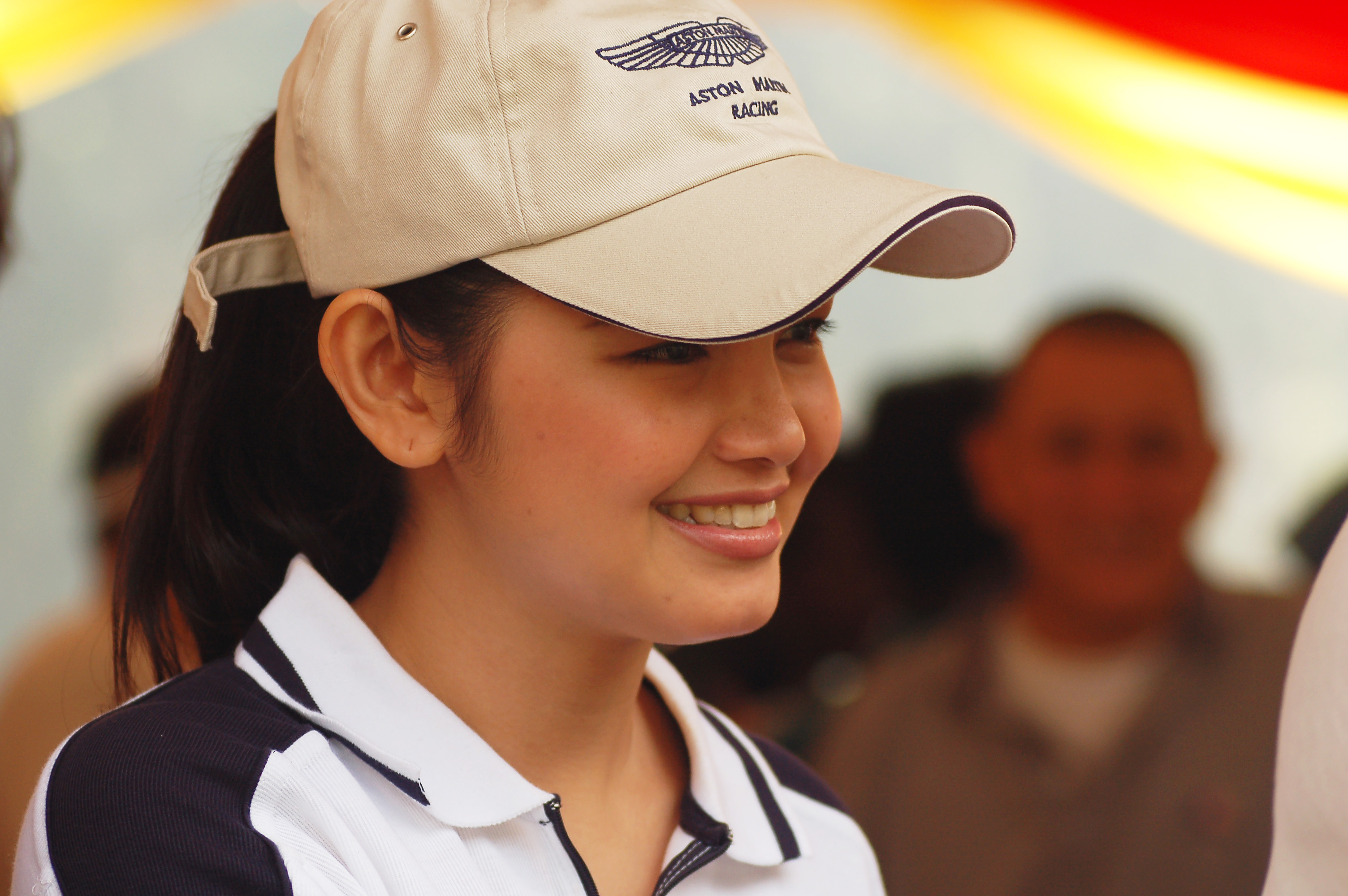
Siti Nurhaliza during the Malay Mail Big Walk 2007, a charity event to collect donations for children with bone cancer.

Throughout her career, she has been involved in a number of charity-related event, including organising charity concerts, open houses and launching her own charity funds. In March 2004, she launched Tabung Prihatin Siti, making her the first Malaysian artist to have a charity fund after her namesake whose aim to raise at least RM 50,000 for children's education and medical treatment. In January 2005, Nurhaliza donated RM 35 000 (about United States dollar11,000) to three different organisations for the 2004 tsunami victims before her concert at the Royal Albert Hall in April of the same year. A year later in February, she donated RM 500,000 for the National Anti-Drug Campaign where she was also appointed as the ambassadress for the campaign. Six months later, she and her husband founded Yayasan Nurjiwa (Nurjiwa Foundation) where the foundation served as a platform for people to help those in need through charity concerts and dinner events where the money will be donated to the selected organisations. In 2009, she and her husband donated RM 1.5 million to build a new mosque in Tikam Batu, Kuala Muda where the land was given as a wakaf by both of them and Siti's mother-in-law where before this, her husband has also donated a sum of money to build two mosques in Kuala Lumpur and Pattani, Thailand which finally completed in February 2011 and officiated by Sultan of Kedah, Tuanku Abdul Halim Muadzam Shah.

In 2011, Siti and her husband gave out an undisclosed amount of Zakat (alms) to more than 200 elderly people, single mothers and disabled people in Tikam Batu as part of their tradition apart from providing them with sarong, batik and some "Duit Raya" (pocket money during Eid al-Fitr) for the children.

In February, she announced a collaboration with Artelier Gallery Kuala Lumpur, in her continuous 2014 effort to raise funds for the Nurjiwa Foundation. With participation from 15 Malaysian, one Spanish and one Iranian painters, "SITI: An Iconic Exhibition of Dato' Siti Nurhaliza" was an exhibition of artworks and sculptures by the 17 painters and artists – their takes on how Siti Nurhaliza has inspired them. A month before the exhibition, every single painter and sculpture artist was given the opportunity to personally interview Siti before proceeding with producing their artworks based on their preferred materials and styles. The exhibition ran from 27 February until 26 March. All the artworks were up for sale, with 30 percent of total grossed sale channelled to Yayasan Nurjiwa. The highest price goes to finger painting made by the Spanish painter, Andrian Torres, priced at RM 75,000.

On 15 April 2020, Siti Nurhaliza launched a fund to aid frontliners and people affected by the coronavirus outbreak in Malaysia. The initiative is called Dana PKP (Peduli, Kemanusiaan, Prihatin) Siti Nurhaliza [Siti Nurhaliza PKP (Care, Humanity, Concern) Fund]. Siti said that the set goal would be increased if the Movement Control Order (MCO) was prolonged and different types of help will be given out. The initiative is divided into three categories: Peduli (Care), Kemanusiaan (Humanity) and Prihatin (Concern). The fund is abbreviated as the Siti Nurhaliza PKP Fund. The Peduli (Care) category provides aid for facilities and equipment at hospitals that handle the pandemic. It also provides funds for the preparation of PPE, nose and mouth coverings, gloves and other equipment. Individuals and families who have lost their earnings including family members with disabilities or serious illness, will fall under the Kemanusiaan (Humanity) category. The Prihatin (Concern) category allowed for the giving of aid to the underprivileged and charities during the month of Ramadan and Syawal. The fund accumulated RM114,711 in two weeks. The fund raised RM78,625 in its first five days. Siti's live concert on YouTube, which aired for almost two hours on 18 April, raised funds amounting to RM29,803.

On 29 May 2021, Siti Nurhaliza, NurJiwa Foundation, and CTDK Holdings, announced the launch of the NurJiwa Foundation & CTDK Holdings: Palestine and Covid-19 Special Aid Fund, which continues the efforts of the Siti Nurhaliza PKP Fund with a focus on Palestine and COVID-19 assistance.

=== Products and endorsements ===
Following success in her singing career, Siti became involved in business. She set up her own company – Siti Nurhaliza Productions (M) Sdn. Bhd. – with activities generally in the entertainment scene. She has four subsidiary companies, Siti Nurhaliza Collections Sdn. Bhd., Siti Nurhaliza Marketing Sdn. Bhd., Siti Sound Sdn. Bhd. and SN Mobile Digital Sdn. Bhd. She is also the president of her own cosmetic range company, Simply Siti Sdn. Bhd. Siti has sold items such as cookware and tea.

In April 2021, Siti, launched her own hijab label, AFIYA by Siti Nurhaliza, with the collaboration of famous Malaysian fashion designer Dato' Jovian Mandagie. She said that The Afiya Label pays tribute to her first-born child, who she says radiates positivity, intelligence, elegance and above all. Siti later added that the label is said to be like a "fairy tale come to life" and a "dream come true" for Siti Nurhaliza.. Siti receives substantial income through commissions and royalties for her endorsements and as ambassador of products. She has been an ambassador and spokesperson for international products such as Jusco, Maxis, Maybelline, Minolta, Mitsubishi, Olay, Pantene, Pepsi, Samsung and TM Net.

== Personal life ==
=== Marriage and children ===
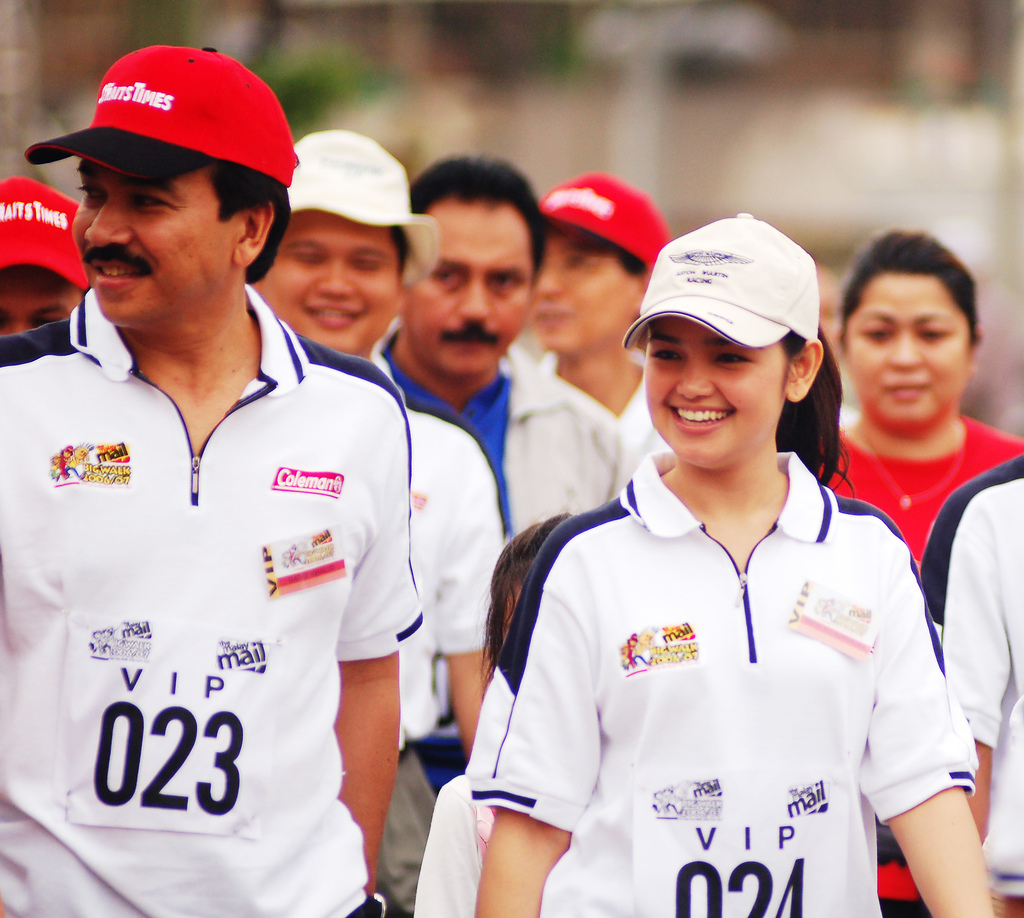
Siti Nurhaliza and her husband, Datuk Khalid during the Malay Mail Big Walk in 2007.

On 17 July 2006, after months of speculation by the media, Siti and her then-fiancé, Datuk Khalid made a press conference announcing that their wedding would be held on 21 August. Her plan to marry Datuk Khalid brought criticism and uproar, since she was going to marry a 47-year-old divorcee with four sons where she was accused of causing his divorce. However, the issue was rebutted when Jabatan Agama Islam Selangor (Selangor Islamic Council) verified that Datuk Khalid and his former wife, Tengku Zawyah Tengku Izham officially separated in February 2004, after 15 years of marriage.

Some sources speculated that the total wedding cost was RM 12,888,888 (US$3,947,980 (adjusted to 2010 inflation)); however, it was later denied by the couple and the wedding planner and stated that the total cost was roughly around RM 500,000. Her wedding dowry was revealed to cost at RM 22,222 and the hantaran (gifts from groom to bride and vice versa) cost around RM 30,000. The total sponsored items including Siti and spouse's jewelleries, dresses, etc., cost more than RM 9 million. Later, RM 1 million from the total price paid by TV3 to broadcast the whole ceremony was later donated to charity. The engagement ceremony was held at Masjid Wilayah Persekutuan (Federal Territory Mosque) on 21 August 2006. The ceremony was also televised live and gathered more than 2 million viewers. The first wedding reception was held on 28 August 2006, at the Kuala Lumpur Convention Centre (KLCC). and was televised to 6.3 million viewers nationwide. The wedding also received coverage from Indonesia, where 10 Indonesian media representatives were there to capture the moment including Trans TV, SCTV and Jawa Pos. Photographed by celebrity photographer Kid Chan, it was a star-studded affair, with guests including royal families, VIPs, celebrities, close friends and family. Indonesian celebrities like Hetty Koes Endang and one of Siti's closest friends, Krisdayanti were given the opportunity to give a performance to the newlywed and guests. A second reception was held on 3 September 2006, in Siti's hometown of Kuala Lipis, Pahang where more than 10,000 people attended the ceremony including those from neighbouring countries. In the same year, the wedding charted as one of the 20 top celebrity weddings on Yahoo! Buzz. In 2011, her wedding was also listed in CNBC's "Asia's Most High-Profile Weddings", where her wedding was ranked in the top 5.

On 13 June 2010, Siti and her husband, Datuk Seri Khalid, was recognised by E! News Asia as the Third Most Powerful Celebrity Couple in Asia, behind Chinese entertainer couple, Simon Yam and wife, Qi Qi and Bollywood superstar couple, Aishwarya Rai and husband, Abhishek Bachchan.

In December 2015, Siti suffered a miscarriage two months into her pregnancy prompting her to share her difficult fertility journey with the public. In October 2017 after seeking longterm treatment at an Alpha Fertility Centre, Siti announced via social media live that she was expecting her first child with Datuk Khalid. Their daughter was born on 19 March 2018 via caesarean section. The new parents said they chose Monday as the delivery date for their first child as it coincided with the Prophet Muhammad's birthday. They named their daughter Siti Aafiyah Khalid. On 1 December 2020, Siti announced she was 4 months pregnant via her social media. On 19 April 2021, Siti gave birth to her second child, a son. They named their son Muhammad Afwa Khalid.

In December 2020, Siti as recipient for the homegrown Nona Superwoman Award, had mentioned that Khalid is the pusher in her success.

=== Wealth ===
Siti is a wealthy businesswoman in Malaysia. She currently tops the list of the 'Richest Artistes' in Malaysia. She is also reported to worth more than US$50 million [RM 212 million] as of 2025, enabling her to be named as one of the millionaires in entertainment industry, especially in the South East Asia region. She is said to be paid RM 70,000 (US$16,728) for a 30 minutes show and RM 110,000 (US$26,287) for an hour show in also about RM 90,000 (US$21,507) for 4 songs show in 2019/2020.

== Controversies ==
Siti Nurhaliza and her husband Datuk Seri Khalid Mohamad Jiwa were issued a RM10,000 compound each for violating the COVID-19 standard operating procedure (SOP) during the tahnik ceremony for their second child. Selangor police chief Comm Datuk Arjunaidi Mohamed said Minister in the Prime Minister's Department (Religious Affairs) Datuk Dr Zulkifli Mohamad Al-Bakri along with Ustaz Azhar Idrus, Ustaz Don Daniyal and Ustaz Iqbal were also issued with RM2,000 compounds each. It was reported that police had earlier detected an article from an online news portal on the dissatisfaction of people online over the tahnik ceremony which was held at the celebrities' residence at Bukit Antarabangsa here.

== Discography ==
Studio albums

- Siti Nurhaliza I (1996)
- Siti Nurhaliza II (1997)
- Cindai (1997)
- Adiwarna (1998)
- Pancawarna (1999)
- Sahmura (2000)
- Safa (2001)
- Sanggar Mustika (2002)
- E.M.A.S. (2003)
- Anugerah Aidilfitri (2003)
- Prasasti Seni (2004)
- Transkripsi (2006)
- Hadiah Daripada Hati (2007)
- Lentera Timur (2008)
- Tahajjud Cinta (2009)
- All Your Love (2011)
- Fragmen (2014)
- SimetriSiti (2017)
- ManifestaSITI2020 (2020)
- Legasi (2021)
- Sitism (2023)
- Gema Bumantara (2025)

Collaborative studio albums

- Seri Balas (with Noraniza Idris) (1999)
- CTKD (with Krisdayanti) (2009)

== Concerts and tours ==
Malaysia

- 1999: Konsert Live Siti Nurhaliza, Stadium Putra Bukit Jalil, Malaysia
- 2001: Konsert Mega Siti Nurhaliza, Bukit Jalil 2001, Malaysia
- 2002: Konsert Salam Akhir Siti Nurhaliza – Untukmu Sudir, Istana Budaya, Malaysia
- 2004: Siti Nurhaliza Live in Concert 2004, Stadium Nasional Bukit Jalil, Malaysia
- 2006: Konsert Akustik Siti Nurhaliza, Malaysia
- 2007: Konsert Istana Cinta, Istana Budaya, Malaysia
- 2009: SATU Konsert Eksklusif Dato' Siti Nurhaliza, Istana Budaya, Malaysia
- 2009: Konsert Seribu Warna, Stadium Malawati, Shah Alam, Malaysia
- 2010: Konsert SATU Suara, Istana Budaya, Malaysia
- 2012: Dato' Siti Nurhaliza Concert Live in Kuantan 2012, Bukit Gambang Resort City, Gambang, Malaysia
- 2013: Siti Nurhaliza in Symphony Live with The Malaysian Philharmonic Orchestra, Petronas Philharmonic Hall, Malaysia
- 2013: Konsert Lentera Timur Dato' Siti Nurhaliza Esklusif Bersama Orkestra Tradisional Malaysia, Istana Budaya, Malaysia
- 2014: Dato' Siti Nurhaliza Live in Concert – Where The Heart Is, Plenary Hall, Kuala Lumpur City Centre (KLCC), Malaysia
- 2015: Dato' Siti Nurhaliza Unplugged 2015, Istana Budaya, Malaysia
- 2015: Konsert Satu Suara, Vol. 2, Istana Budaya, Malaysia
- 2016: Dato' Siti Nurhaliza & Friends Concert, Stadium Negara, Malaysia
- 2019: Dato' Sri Siti Nurhaliza On Tour Concert, Axiata Arena, Kuala Lumpur, Malaysia
- 2019: Konsert Amal Orkestra Tradisional Malaysia bersama Siti Nurhaliza, Auditorium POWIIS, Prince of Wales Island International School, Penang, Malaysia
- 2019: Shopee X SIMPLYSITI Mini Concert, KL Convention Centre, Conference Hall 1–3, Malaysia
- 2019: Karya Agung Pak Ngah (Datuk Suhaimi Mohd Zain) bersama Orkestra Tradisional Malaysia dan Dato' Sri Siti Nurhaliza
- 2020: Konsert Manifestival Siti Nurhaliza X HotKool, Virtual Concert
- 2022: Music of the Soul, Plenary Hall, Kuala Lumpur
- 2023: Konsert Satu Suara Vol. 3, Mega Star Arena, Kuala Lumpur
- 2024: Sebuah Epitome: Saya Siti Nurhaliza
- 2024: Siti Nurhaliza – Love is in the sky (Cinta Di Awan), Arena of Stars, Genting Highlands
- 2024: The Journey of Sound: Judika & Dato' Sri Siti Nurhaliza, Stadium Merdeka
- 2025: Violet Skies: Dato' Sri Siti Nurhaliza Live in Arena of Stars, Genting Highlands
- 2026: Legacy 30 Siti Nurhaliza Concert
- 2026: Konsert Tradisional Gema Bumantara

Singapore

- 2000: Siti Nurhaliza Live at Harbour Front, Singapore
- 2005: Siti Nurhaliza Live 2005, Indoor Stadium, Singapore
- 2008: Konsert Diari Hati Siti Nurhaliza, Esplanade Theatre, Singapore
- 2010: Konsert Bagaikan Sakti, Esplanade Theatre, Singapore
- 2014: Dato' Siti Nurhaliza Live in Singapore, The Star Theatre, Singapore
- 2019: Dato' Sri Siti Nurhaliza on Tour Concert, Singapore Expo, Singapore
- 2020: Konsert Karya Agung Pak Ngah – Pak Ngah's Legendary Hits in Concert by Orkestra Tradisional Malaysia ft. Dato' Sri Siti Nurhaliza, Esplanade Theatre, Singapore
- 2024: Fenomena – Dato' Sri Siti Nurhaliza Live in Singapore
- 2025: The Next Wave - Dato' Sri Siti Nurhaliza

Indonesia

- 2002: Konsert 1 Jam Bersama Siti Nurhaliza
- 2003: Konsert Azimat Siti Nurhaliza
- 2003: Konsert Special Siti Nurhaliza
- 2004: Konsert Exclusive Melanesia – Siti Nurhaliza
- 2004: Konsert Mutiara Negeri Jiran – Siti Nurhaliza
- 2004: Siti Nurhaliza Indonesia Tour 2004, Indonesia
- 2011: Charity Concert Banjarmasin, Indonesia
- 2017: Golden Memories International Spesial Siti Nurhaliza
- 2019: Dato' Sri Siti Nurhaliza on Tour Concert, Istora Senayan, Jakarta, Indonesia

Others

- 2001: Konsert SEA Diva bersama Kris Dayanti, Sheila Majid, Kuh Ledesma, Vina Panduwinata, Fauziah Latiff dan Titi DJ
- 2001: Konsert Perjalanan Seni SM Salim bersama MPO
- 2002: Siti Nurhaliza Live in Brunei, Brunei
- 2005: Siti Nurhaliza in Concert, Royal Albert Hall London, United Kingdom
- 2010: Siti Nurhaliza Live @ Alumbra, Australia
- 2019: Siti Nurhaliza The Voice of Asia in Australia For One Night Only – OzAsia Festival, Festival Theatre, Adelaide, Australia

== Videography ==
Concert Albums

- 1999: Konsert Live Siti Nurhaliza
- 2001: Konsert Mega Siti Nurhaliza, Bukit Jalil 2001
- 2002: Konsert Salam Akhir Siti Nurhaliza – Untukmu Sudir
- 2004: Secretaries Week Celebration 2004
- 2004: Siti Nurhaliza Live in Concert 2004
- 2005: Siti Nurhaliza in Concert, Royal Albert Hall London
- 2006: Konsert Akustik Siti Nurhaliza
- 2006: Siti Nurhaliza in Concert, Royal Albert Hall London
- 2007: The Best of Siti Nurhaliza – DVD Karaoke
- 2009: Anugerah Aidilfitri – DVD Karaoke
- 2014: Konsert Lentera Timur Dato' Siti Nurhaliza
- 2015: Konsert Unplugged Dato' Siti Nurhaliza
- 2018: Konsert Satu Suara, Vol. 2

Video Albums

- 1998: CT Best
- 1999: CT Best 2
- 2000: The Best of Siti Nurhaliza
- 2001: CT Best 3
- 2001: CT Best 4
- 2003: CT Best 5
- 2003: CT Best 6
- 2003: CT Best 7
- 2004: CT Best 8
- 2008: 2 Diva (with Krisdayanti)
- 2009: Puing-Puing Cinta Vol.1
- 2009: Puing-Puing Cinta Vol.2

== Art exhibition ==
- 2014: SITI: An Iconic Exhibition of Dato' Siti Nurhaliza

== Written works ==
Apart from singing and hosting, she also has written numbers of articles in several newspapers and magazine.

| Year | Title | Newspaper/Magazine |
|---|---|---|
| 1999 | Lenggok Siti | Metro Ahad (Sunday Edition) |
| 2006 | Pena Siti | Kosmo! Ahad (Sunday Edition) |
| 2010–2012 | Catatan Siti Nurhaliza | Mangga |
| 2011 | Dari Dalam Diri Siti Nurhaliza | Berita Harian |

== See also ==
- Honorific nicknames in popular music
- Music of Malaysia
- Malaysian pop
- List of Malaysians
- List of Malays
