= SimplySiti =

Malaysian cosmetic company

SIMPLYSITI Sdn. Bhd.
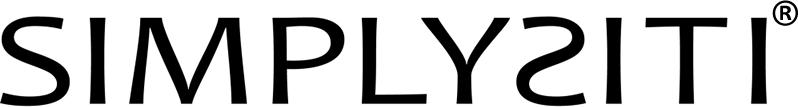
- Type: Private Limited Company
- Industry: Cosmetics, personal care
- Founded: 30 March 2010; 16 years ago
- Founder: Siti Nurhaliza
- Headquarters: Kuala Lumpur, Malaysia
- Key people: Siti Nurhaliza (President); Datuk Khalid Mohd Jiwa (Co-President); Datuk Normaziah Sheikh Mohamed; P.Y. Wong
- Products: Skincare, lipstick, make-up, perfume
- Website: simplysiti.com.my

SimplySiti logo, used until 2015.

SimplySiti Sdn. Bhd. (written in all caps) is a Malaysian cosmetic company founded by a Malaysian singer, Siti Nurhaliza in March 2010 with the headquarters in Kuala Lumpur, Malaysia. The brand's name was derived from the word "simplicity".

== History ==
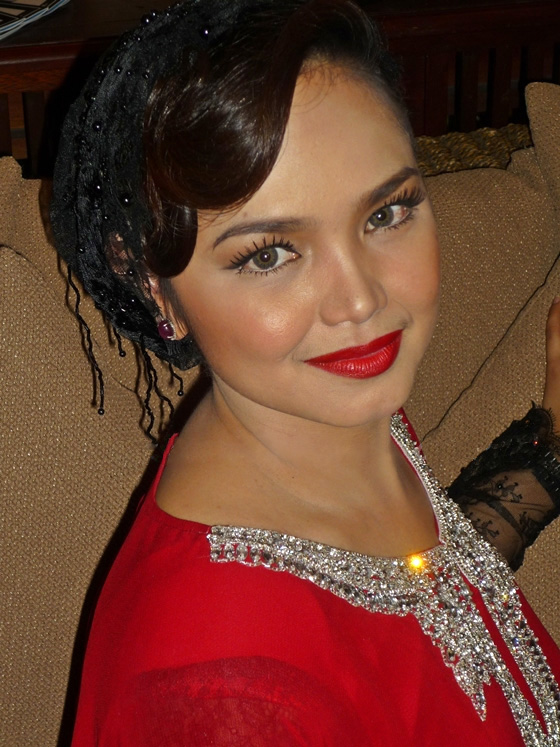
Siti Nurhaliza during the launching of new red lipstick colours on 30 September 2010.

Launched in early 2010, SimplySiti is Siti Nurhaliza's second attempt to participate in a business industry after her first trial with her CTea came to a dead end, and the production of her branded tea was stopped in March to focus more on SimplySiti. With the help of her husband, Datuk Seri Khalid Mohd Jiwa and two others business partners, she ventured into the cosmetic industry after two years of research with AC Nielsen to study the market and target customers. The cosmetics are produced in Korea. with the incorporation of nanotechnology. Before being released into the market, SimplySiti received Halal status from Jabatan Kemajuan Islam Malaysia (JAKIM) officials who visited the factory in Korea to inspect every aspect of the production with strict regulations to ensure the products are Halal. Many of the products, especially her lipstick range released bear the names from her singles' and albums' titles. Marketing strategies include availability of the products over 200 Watsons, Guardian and Jusco outlets throughout Malaysia, with its first kiosk at the JB Sentral in Johor Bahru and there are plans for promoting the products to Brunei, Indonesia, Singapore and Middle East countries.

In July, Siti signed a contract a British toiletries company, Standard Soap for producing SimplySiti new products such as shampoo, anti-perspirant and other toiletries for release in February 2011, which could worth up to £5 million for the first three to four years.

A limited gold edition of SimplySiti products with her signature was released in late August especially for Hari Raya Aidilfitri and a month later, a new collection known as "SimplySiti Glam Red" was released with five new hues for the lipstick collection.

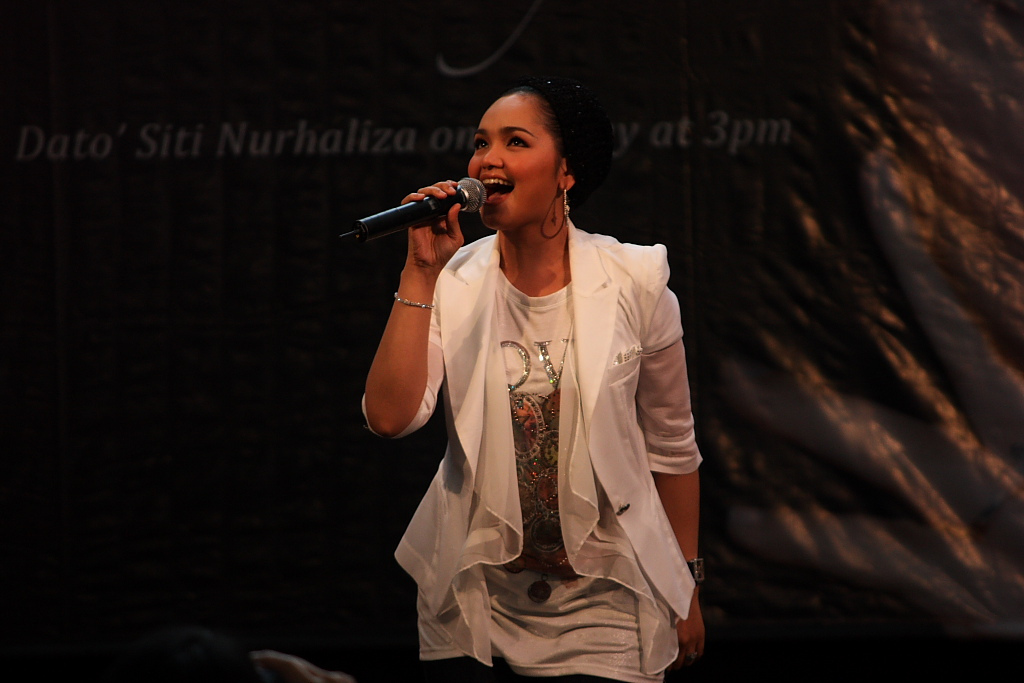
Siti Nurhaliza performing during SimplySiti promotion tour at The Spring, Kuching on 6 June 2010.

== Promotion ==
Siti was personally involved with the promotion of the products including starring in the product's television commercials and touring malls around Malaysia where she also released a theme song for the SimplySiti products, Rahsiaku Kini Milikmu (It Used To Be My Secret, Now It's Yours).

== See also ==
- Movit
- Adore Beauty
- KORA Organics
